= Fauna of Azerbaijan =

Native animals of Azerbaijan

Fauna of Azerbaijan or animal kingdom of Azerbaijan refers to the diversity of various types of animals, which inhabit and populate a defined ground or water area in Azerbaijan.

The first reports on the richness and diversity of animal life in Azerbaijan can be found in travel notes of Eastern travelers. Animal carvings on architectural monuments, ancient rocks and stones survived up to the present times. The first information on the animal kingdom of Azerbaijan was collected during the visits of naturalists to Azerbaijan in the 17th century. Unlike fauna, the concept of animal kingdom covers not only the types of animals, but also the number of individual species.

The symbol of Fauna in Azerbaijan is the Karabakh horse (Azeri: Qarabağ atı) which is a mountain-steppe racing and riding horse which can only be found in Azerbaijan. The Karabakh horse has a reputation for its good temper, speed, elegance and intelligence. It is one of the oldest breeds, with ancestry dating to the ancient world. The horse was originally developed in the Azerbaijani Karabakh region in the 5th century and is named after it.

== General information ==
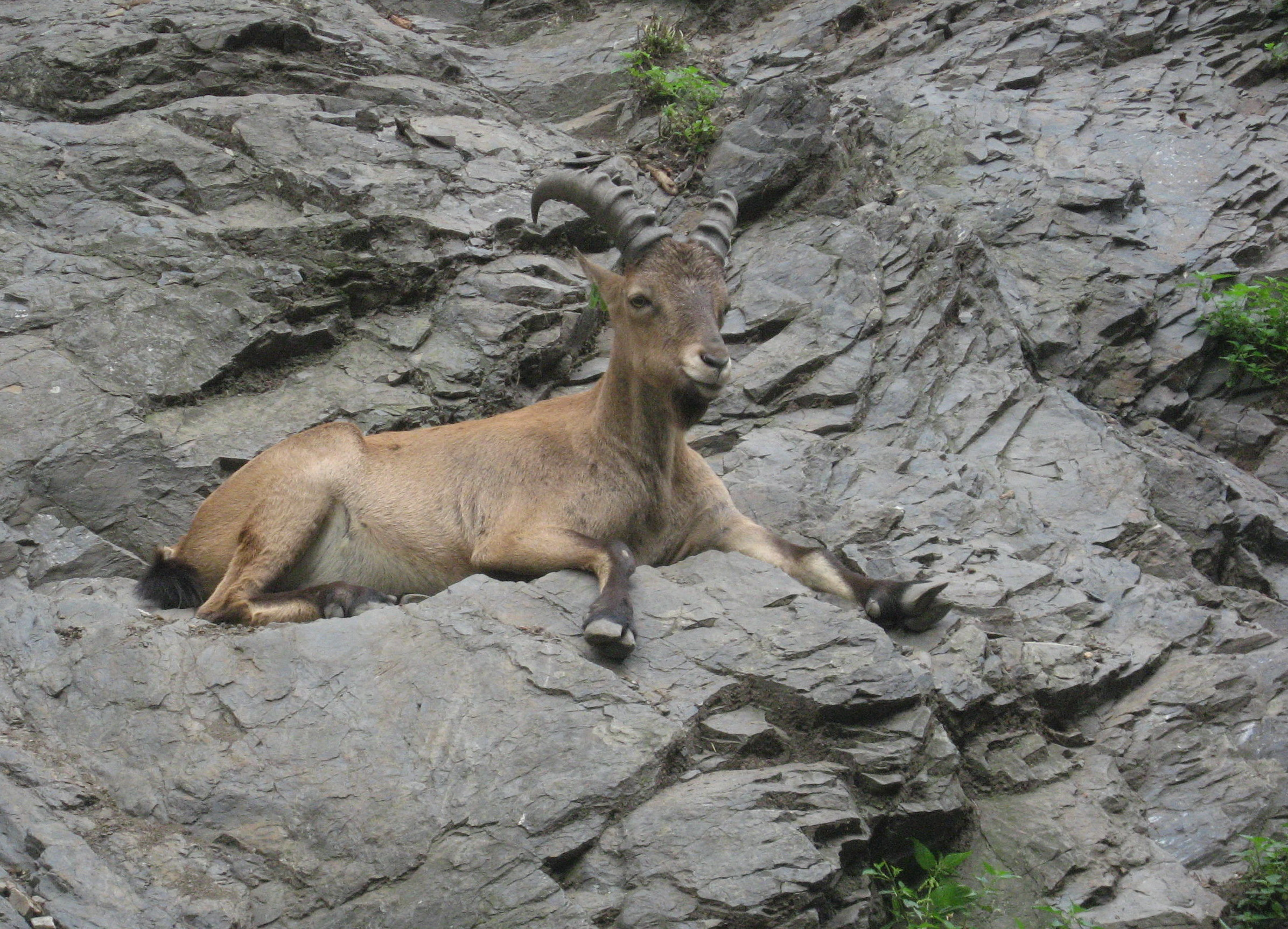
The Caucasian goat occurs in the mountains of the Caucasus

Animal resources are mainly used for food (meat, egg, butter canned food), as raw materials in industry (feather, leather, horns and technical oil). People use animals as working power in agriculture. At the same time drugs, perfumes, fertilizers and fodder are produced from animals` products.

Some animals in Azerbaijan are endangered because of threats from changing environments or predators. These animals are entered into the Red Book of Azerbaijan. Presently the Red Book includes 108 species of animals (14 species of mammals, 36 species of birds, 13 species of reptiles and amphibians, 5 species of birds and 40 species of insects).

The natural habitat of various types of animals is very different within the country. Some species populate special restricted areas like lakes, parts of mountainous areas, while others are spread throughout the country. For example, passerine birds occur anywhere in the territory of Azerbaijan. Protozoa parasites are also registered in all areas of the country, depending on natural habitat of carrier animals like cattle, poultry. Among mammals, goitered gazelle populate plain areas, West Caucasian tur inhabits the major Caucasus areas, most species of birds can be found in forests, some in water basins. Pest insects occupy different agricultural fields, while others populate defined biotopes only.

== Animal kingdom ==
The animal kingdom of Azerbaijan is very rich, partly due to diversity of its natural complexes. There are 106 species of mammals, 357 species of birds, 67 species of reptiles and amphibians, 97 species of fish, and over 15 thousand species of invertebrates in Azerbaijan.

=== Mammals ===
Some 107 species of mammals have been recorded in Azerbaijan, three of which are unique species. Popular species are Caucasus goats and west-Caucasus moufflons; which inhabit Nakhchivan and western slopes of the major Caucasus in Balakan, Qabala, Zaqatala and Ismayilly regions. Jeyran gazelles are among the rarest and fastest species in Caucasus they can only be found in Shirvan natural preserve, Bendovan and Korchay regions of Azerbaijan. In 2014, 150 gazelles were returned to their historical territories as part of the four-year "Reintroduction of gazelles to their historical habitat areas in Caucasus" project. Caucasus goat is generally found in high altitudes of the Caucasus where the air is very thin and predators are rarely found. Comparing with domestic goats Caucasus goat's fur is very thick, and thanks to it the animal is well adapted to low temperature of the mountains.

The Caucasus mouflon, a wild type of sheep, is bigger and muscular than domestic sheep. The mouflons prefer the plains where they can graze the whole year. These agile rock climbers have long and muscular legs. Thanks to this feature they can run very fast.

The Caucasian leopard (Panthera pardus tulliana), one of the rarest animals in the world, inhabits the southern Caucasus Mountains, Zangezur Range and the Talish Mountains in Azerbaijan. Caucasian leopards are endangered because of illegal hunt, human disturbance, etc. The World Wildlife Fund has stated that these animals are one of the most critically endangered species in the Caucasus Mountains.

The Caspian tiger, also called Hyrcanian tiger was found in Azerbaijan until the late 1950s. But it became extinct over 40 years ago. Scientific investigation in this field proved that the Caspian Tiger and the Siberian Tiger are distinguished by only one genetic code letter. The last Caspian tigers were seen in foothills of Talysh Mountains and the Lenkoran river basin which are situated in south of Azerbaijan in 1964.

The fauna of Greater Caucasus which is natural boundary in the north of Azerbaijan is very rich include mammals such as lynx, Caucasian brown bear, Asiatic wildcat, European badger, stone marten, red and roe deer, chamois, East Caucasian ibex, Caucasian squirrel, field mice, Daghestan pine vole. Ismayilli Nature Reserve near Gebele district of Azerbaijan is one of the places where you can see wild goats. Asiatic wildcat, jungle cat, and wild boar inhabit the Samur Forest, located at the Caspian coast near the Russian border.

Absheron National Park, which is located in the Absheron Peninsula, is famous for its gazelles and Caspian seal haulouts. Five-toed jerboas, social vole, grey dwarf hamster are common in the territory of Baku, the capital of Azerbaijan.

The natural inhabitants of Gobustan, Kyzylagach and Shirvan national parks are jackals, wolves, foxes, marbled polecats, hares, giant ditch frogs, huge flocks of migratory birds, jungle cat, golden jackal, boar, Eurasian water vole, etc. Gobustan is also famous for rock art.

Talysh Mountains of Azerbaijan are covered with dense forests, where Caspian shrew, Schelkovikov’s pine vole, and Hyrcanian field mouse, southern white-breasted hedgehog, Levantine mole, western barbastelle, steppe and Black Sea field mice, and Indian crested porcupine are common. Hirkan National Park is located here.

Nakhchevan Autonomous Republic of Azerbaijan have some rare mammals and reptiles. More common species such as Macedonian mouse, Vinogradov’s and Persian jirds, social vole, and Transcaucasian mole vole. Pallas’s cat is the rarest animal in the area.

=== Fish ===
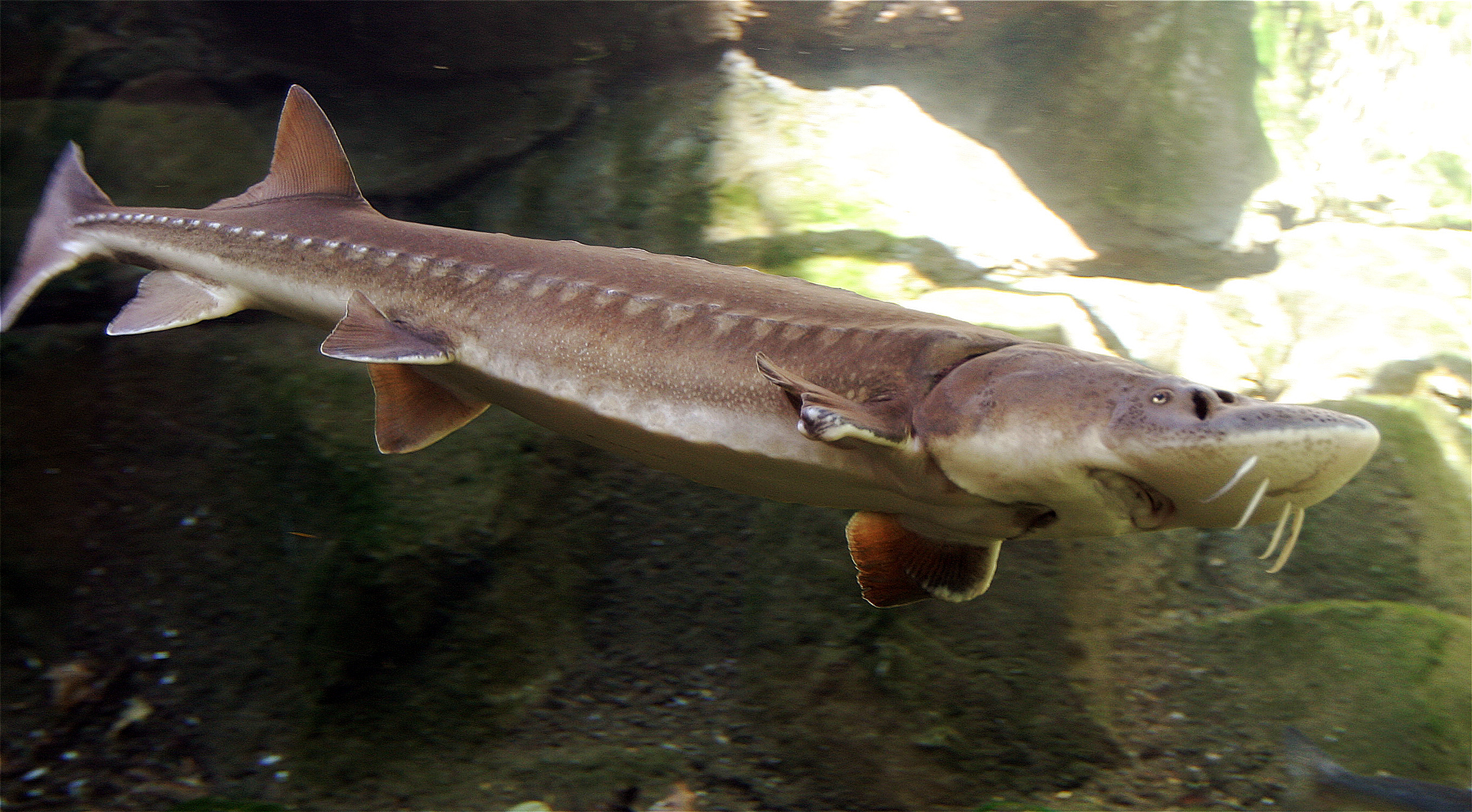
In the early history of Azerbaijan, sturgeon used to be mistaken for a sea monster.

The country's fresh water basins and the Caspian Sea account for 97 species of fish of which eight introduced and seven of these have become widespread and over 15 thousand species of invertebrates in Azerbaijan. Most can be found in the Kura River, surrounding lakes, as well as in the Mingechevir reservoir. Most of fish are anadromous or semi-anadromous (the young grow up in salt water and migrate to fresh water to breed after they reach maturity). The most valuable of anadromous fish are salmon, sturgeon, stellate sturgeon and beluga. Aspius, Chalcalburnus and eel are also anadromous fish. Sturgeon meat and caviar are highly valuable. Beside, the water basins of Azerbaijan contain such valuable fish species as bream, sazan, rutilus kutum and others. Such fish species as herring are fished in the Caspian Sea. Due to the construction of a number of hydrotechnical plants on the Kura river after 1959, the regulation of the river water flow, as well as the Caspian water pollution led to the significant reduction in the number of valuable fish species. Three hatcheries (Kuragzi, Alibayramli and Kur experimental sturgeon hatchery) for melioration and fish-farming purposes were launched to restore the fish reserves and to increase the number of fish in species. Azerbaijan's fish-farming establishments and hatcheries account for breeding of 20 million sturgeons, 600 thousand salmons, over 800 thousand. A new hatchery with the capacity of 20 million sturgeons was put in commission in Khyly in 2000.

Two new fish species (Stone moroko (Pseudorasbora parva) and Korean sharpbelly (Hemiculter leucisculus)) have been discovered in Azerbaijan in 1970s. Stone morocco lives in all inland waters of Azerbaijan.

Korean sharpbelly also is river fish living in Kura and Araz rivers, in the rivers of Lankaran region, Mingachevir water reservoir. Both of them can be found in the Azerbaijani sector of the Caspian Sea from Absheron peninsula to Astara region. The oldest specimen of Korean sharpbelly found in the rivers is five years old with a length of 150 mm and weighs 25.4 grams.

=== Avifauna ===
Azerbaijan is incredibly rich in avifauna. There are 363 species of birds recorded from about 60 families, ranges from the large birds such as vultures, eagles, flamingos, pelicans, cranes to different kinds of colorful little birds such as bee-eaters, Hoopoe, woodcock, little stint, as well as water fowls including ducks, geese and swans. Around 40% of the species are staying all year in Azerbaijan, 27% overwinter there, and 10% pass through on migration. One of the most inspiring bird species is the golden eagle which inhabits mainly mountainous areas such as Nakhchivan. The golden eagle has been printed on dozens of stamps and cards in Azerbaijan.

The winter in Azerbaijan is not cold, relatively mild. Therefore many birds from north migrate here in winter. Water birds such as swans, geese, ducks, flamingos, and waders like Black-tailed Godwit, curlews, and snipes usually collect in the wetlands, coastal and inland areas of Azerbaijan. Common and Great Black-headed Gulls may be found along the coast.

In winter some small birds from north also chose Azerbaijan for wintering. Most birds of the alpine zone, like Guldenstadt's Redstart and Great rosefinch move to river valleys to winter.

In February waterfowl and shorebirds move north. Hoopoe and Barn Swallow arrive early from the south.

=== Other ===
Ten species of amphibians from five families are recorded in Azerbaijan. There are 52 species of reptiles found in Azerbaijan. Most of these species are found in semi-desert areas in Shamakhi and Nakhchivan. Few are found in other lowlands or mountainous areas. In 1937, members of the Opilio lepidus species of harvestman were sited in the country.

== Reserves ==
Several reserves have been established in Azerbaijan to preserve the fauna, flora and their ecosystems:

- Goy-Gol State Reserve
- Gyzylaghadj State Reserve
- Zagatala State Reserve
- Zakatala State Reserve
- Turyanchay State Reserve
- Pirgulu State Reserve
- Shirvan State Reserve
- Besitchay State Reserve
- Qarayazy State Reserve
- Ismayilly State Reserve
- Qaragol State Reserve
- Ilisu State Reserve
- Shahbuz State Reserve
- Eldar pine-tree State Reserve

== See also ==
- Nature of Azerbaijan
- Karabakh Horse
- National Parks of Azerbaijan
- State Reserves of Azerbaijan
