= Natural resources of Azerbaijan =

Azerbaijan is a country with very favorable natural conditions and rich natural resources. Snowy peaks, high mountains, foothill fertile soils, wide plains, Lowest Land Points Below Ocean Level are the main landscape forms of the republic. This complex landscape structure has resulted in a variety of natural conditions, climate, soil-vegetation, and water resources. This, in turn, led to the uneven distribution of population and farms on the territory, and the specialization of production on different types.

== Mining resources in Azerbaijan ==
The richness of mineral resources in Azerbaijan is related to the complexity of the geological structure.

=== Types of mining resources ===
Minerals extracted in Azerbaijan include oil, gas, shale, and peat. The oil and gas industry are the most valuable among the other resources. Oil is extracted by means of both onshore and offshore (Caspian Sea) operations.

The territory of the Republic (especially the Absheron peninsula) is one of the world's oldest oil-producing regions. The extraction and distribution of oil from the Absheron peninsula to other countries has started from VII-VI centuries of BC.

Around 1.2 billion tons of oil (25% from offshore oilfields) was produced in Azerbaijan until 1985.

=== The Burning Mountain (Yanar dag) ===
The burning mountain is an unknown origin historical monument located in the Absheron Peninsula, near Baku, on the coast of the Caspian Sea, in the village of Mahammedi, occurred as a result of the released natural gas at the foot of the mountain. The location is 27 km away from the city center of Baku, and about 2 km away from the village center, on the left side of the Mahammedi-Digah highway.

The flame in this area resulted from the burning of natural gas flowing to the surface from the underground oil and gas-storing layers through cracks that was caused by volcanic-tectonic movements and processes. Sometimes, the height of the flame reaches 10–15 meters.

By the Decree of the Azerbaijani President dated May 2, 2007, the territory of the "Burning Mountain" was declared to be state-cultural and nature preservation. The territory of this area is 64.55 hectares. This area includes the ‘’Gurd yuvasi’’, two cemeteries that are over thousand years old, and an ancient mosque, Gothursu fount, Ali Stone, Kardashi, Girmaki valley and Yanar dag.

=== Metalliferous resources ===
These excavations (iron, aluminum, chromite, gold, silver, copper, lead, zinc, cobalt, molybdenum ore etc.) brings different ore deposits in the mountainous parts of the republic.

Iron ores (magnetite, hematite) are found in four classes in Azerbaijan: segregation-magmatic, skarn-magnetite (contact-metasomatic), hydrothermal-metasomatic and sedimentation. Only Dashkasan, South Dashkesen and İron ore-bearing regions with skarn-magnetite are for commercial use as ore deposits. These deposits are composed of Kellovey, Oxford, Kimeric aged volcanogenic, pyroclastic and sedimentary-volcanogenic rocks. Industry reserves of the Dashkasen iron ore group deposits are 250mln tons.

Significant industrial cobalt ores are found in the Dashkasek ore region. The cobalt ores are formed both independently (with the Yukhari Dashkasan field) and together with skarn-magnetite ores.

The gold deposits and manifestations are mainly found in the territory of the Lesser Caucasus: Söyüdü, Qızılbulaq, Dağ Qəsəmən, Veynəli, Qoşa, Gədəbəy, Çovdar; Shekerdere, Pyezbashi, Agyurt and Baskand deposits are spread in the Nakhchivan Autonomous Republic. The silver, copper, etc. mixtures are also can be found in these deposits.

At present, numerous manifestations of gold have been discovered (Tulallar, Kepez, Dabalt, Kungutchay, Keleki, Unus and others). Evaluation of gold deposits in powder form from Alincachay and Kurekchay Basin was carried out, initial reserves were calculated and industrial significance was determined.

Chromite deposits and manifestations (Goydere, Kazimbinasi, Ipek, Khatavang etc.) are mainly located in Kalbajar and Lachin regions.

Small-sized deposits and manifestations of manganese have been found in the Somxeti-Agdam (Mollacelli, Dash Salahli, etc.) of the LesserCaucasus, Vandam (Mugar, Balakenchay) and Araz (Bichanak, Alahi) of the Greater Caucasus structure-formation zones.

Copper ore are copper-pyrite and copper-porphyry origin in Azerbaijan. The mineral content of copper-pyrite formations is mainly composed of pyrite and chalcopyrite. Copper-porphyry formations’ ores consist of molybdenum and small amount of noble metals.

There are many copper-porphyry formation ores in this region except Garadagh and Xarxar deposits (Gedebey ore region). There are copper-porphyte deposits in the Mehmana ore-bearing region (Demirli and Xançincay).

Copper-porphyry ore-bearing in the Nakhchivan Autonomous Republic, is mainly located on the Mehri-Ordubad granitoid batholite's exo and endocontact zones (Diakhchay, Goygol, Goydagh etc.). In addition, Halhal copper-pyrite, Goygol, Agridağ copper, Nashirvaz, Kilit-Katam copper-cobalt, Nergirvaz copper-polymetallic are known in this region.

Molybdenum fields are found in Dalidagh (Teymuruchandagh, Baghırsag, etc.) and Ordubad ore regions (Paraghachay Diachchay).

The largest field of aluminum ore (alunite) is in the Dashkasan region (Zaylik alunite deposit). Alunite bearing is also found in Shamkir and Ordubad. The Zaylik alunite deposit has been operated since 1960. This deposit is the largest one in the Europe. Aluminum oxide together with potassium fertilizer, soda, sulfuric acid and so on. is extracted from this ore in Ganja aluminum plants.

Bauxite ore (Sadarak-Sharur districts) which is the best raw material of aluminum is found in areas where Permian deposit sites are spread in the western part of the Nakhchivan Autonomous Republic.

Mercuric ore deposits are widely spread in the central part of the Lesser Caucasus (Kalbajar-Lachin zone). Mercuric ore reserves contained within the largest ore deposits as Agh-Yatagh, Shor-Bulag, Levchay (Kalbajar region), Jilgaz-chay, and Narzanly (Lachin region) have been evaluated. Mercuric mineralization (Cinnabar) occurs at various ages and composition rocks, most commonly Upper Cretaceous volcanic-sedimentary rocks and areas where hyperbasites and Miocene-Pliocene aged acid magmatic rocks are spread. The pyrite, chalcopyrite, antimonite, magnetite, hematite, sphalerite and other minerals are in association with Kinovar ore. Kishlak ores are found in Badamli-Ashaghi of Nakhchivan AR.

The largest deposits of Arsenic in Azerbaijan are found in the Gadabay (Bitibulag Enargit Field) and Julfa (Dardagh auripigment-real bed) areas. This field was exploited until 1941. Arsenic ore body has a shtok-shaped geometry. The content of the ore consists of red orpiment, realgar, antimony and arsenopyrite.

=== Non-metallic mining resources ===
Non-metallic mining resources play an important role in the overall balance of crude mineral resources of Azerbaijan. This group includes rock-salt, gypsum, anhydride, bentonite clays, building materials, pyrite, barite, semi-precious and colorful stones, dolomite, Icelandic quarry and so on.

Rock-salt deposits are located in Nakhchivan Autonomous Republic (Nehram, Düzdağ, Pusyan). The deposits are in the sandstone, clay and limestone sediments of the Miocene. Balanced reserves of the Nehrame field are 73600min tons on the B + S1 category and 64200min on category S2. Reserves are estimated to be 2-2.5 billion tonnes. The industrial reserves of the Duzdag field are 94517 thousand tons on the A + B + S1 category and 37810 thousand tons on the S2 category.

Gypsum, anhydrite deposits are formed in a homogenous way in the Chalky sediments of Yukhari Aghcakand and Manash villages of Goranboy region. They consist of separate stocks, with a total inventory of 65-70 million tons. Industrial reserves of 120 km to the south-east of the city of Nakhchivan (Aras, Gypsum) and around the city of Ganja are 40632 thousand tons on the A + B + S1 category.

The field of Bentonite clay is identified in Gobustan, Goranboy, Sheki, etc. The largest field was found in Gazakh region (Dash Salahli). The field is mainly formed by the influence of hydrothermal product on the Santonian-aged volcanism and its industrial reserves are 84,553 tons.

There are a lot of construction materials in the territory of Azerbaijan. Currently, the estimated commercial reserves of the sawn stone-block deposit on A + B + S1 category (Goyshtak, Garadagh, Guzdek, Stateyarlı, Dilagar, Shahbulag, Naftalan, Mardakan, Dash Salahli, Zayam and others) is 295836 thousand tons, whereas covering stone deposit (Dashkasan, Shahtakhti, Gulabli, Musakoy, Söyglu and others) is 23951 m^{3} thousand for the time being.

There are raw materials in the Garadagh field, which are suitable for cement production (Shakhga limestone, Garadagh clay, etc.). Many clay deposits for drilling, brick and ceramics are exploited. The limestone deposit with 8.3 thousand m^{3} is determined which is suitable for the production of flysch and carbide in the territory of Siyazan region.

The volcanic ash-tuff is a zeolite raw material and the belonged field (Aydagh) is located in 7 km north-western of Tovuz. The average thickness of the volcanic ash and tuff in the Aydagh field is 25-30m. And it is among Santonian-Campanian carbonate deposits. Moreover, zeolites(clinoptilolites) mixed with 20-80% silica have been found within these tuffs. The average amount of zeolite on that deposit is 55%. Estimated potential reserve of Aidagh tuffs is 20 mln tons.

Semi-precious and precious minerals (gems) were reported to be associated with the Dashcasan and Ordubad skarn ore deposits (granite, garnet, amethyst) of Lesser Caucasus, as well as volcanic rocks with Gadabay (tourmaline) and Khanlar regions (chalcedony, agate, heliotrop).

There are large-scale deposits of dolomite in the nearby Nehram village (Nakhchivan AR) and Boyanata Mountain (Gobustan). Quartz sand for glass production was found in Gobustan, Absheron peninsula and Guba region.

There are chemical paints in Dashkesen, Shamakhi, Kalbajar and Khanlar districts.

The mud with medical treatment properties is located in the Absheron Peninsula, Masazir Lake, Gobustan and Lower Kura, and in areas where mud volcano outbursts are pervasive.

== The mud volcanoes ==
Azerbaijan is known as a unique and classic development zone of mud volcanoes on the Earth. The 344 of the 2000 widely known mud volcanoes on the Earth are located in the east of Azerbaijan and in the Caspian Sea boundary. Most of the mud volcanoes are spread over Baku and the Absheron Peninsula, and some of them have been formed as a natural monument.

Mud volcanoes play an important role in placing exploration wells of oil and gas fields without extra surveying costs. Additionally, mud volcano clays are considered to be useful and important minerals. Also, volcanic mud is successfully used in the treatment of many diseases of the nervous system, skin and bone joints. At the same time, volcanoes are important in terms of prediction of events such as seismic events and earthquakes.

== Cotton production in Azerbaijan ==
Cotton is often called "white gold" in Azerbaijan.

In the Caucasus regions, especially in Azerbaijan, cotton spread through countries of the Ancient East, mainly by Iran. The exporting of textiles made of cotton from cities such as Barda, Nakhchivan, Beylagan, Ganja, Shamkir and others to abroad, as well as cotton fabrics exporting from Shamakhi to Russia in the 15th century can be highlighted.

Cotton exports from Azerbaijan to Russia have been expanded from XVII century. In the 18th century, there were large cotton fields on the plains of Mil-Mughan and Shirvan. At the beginning of the 19th century the cotton industry was being developed in Guba and Baku. In the 1930s, Egypt and America, as well as local Mazandaran and Iravan cotton varieties were being cultivated in Azerbaijan.

After Northern Azerbaijan was joined to Russia, cotton production in Azerbaijan developed, especially from the end of the 19th century.

At the beginning of the 20th century, the cotton industry was expanded in Azerbaijan due to the Russian textile industry declining. In 1913 the cotton industry area was more than 100 thousand hectares, whereas the cotton production was 65 thousand tons.

There are five types of cotton in Azerbaijan:

• Ordinary cotton (Gossypium hirsutum L.) (medicine purposed)

• Gossipium Barbadenze (Gossypium barbadense)

• Gossipium Triquspitatum

• Gossipium Arboreum (Gossypium arboreum)

• Gossipium Herboseum (Gossypium herbaceum)

== Water resources ==
=== Water reservoirs ===
There are 61 reservoirs (each of them has a capacity of 1 mln m^{3}) available in Azerbaijan. The total volume of water reservoirs is 21.5 km^{3}. Water reservoirs are built on the riverbed as well as beyond the river itself. Most reservoirs are regulated according to seasons and used for irrigation purposes.

The largest Mingachevir reservoir of the republic started to be operated in 1953 and it is operated in a multi-year regime, the flow of the Kur River is completely regulated downstream and overflooding is prevented.

=== Rivers ===
The river system of the Republic has more than 8350 rivers, 2 of them are the length of more than 500 km, the length of the 22 rivers are between 101 and 500 km, the length of the 324 rivers are between 11 and 100 km, and the length of majority rivers is less than 10 km.

The river system of the Republic consists of the Kur River and its branches, as well as rivers directed into the Caspian Sea.

Kur River is the main water source and artery of Azerbaijan. The flowing path of river goes through Turkey, Georgia and Azerbaijan. The cumulative area of the river is 188,000 square km, which of 58,000 square km or 31% of the area belongs to Azerbaijan. After passing the Georgian border, the Kur river's flow rate in the Girag Kasaman settlement is 270 m^{3} / s or 8.52 km^{3}. Whereas, at the Kur-Salyan station the average perennial flow rate is 445 m^{3} / s or 14.04 km^{3}.

The Araz River, the second largest river in the Republic and the right branch of the Kur River flow path starts from Turkey territory, as well as it is a border river between Turkey and Armenia, Turkey and Azerbaijan and Iran and Azerbaijan. The cumulative area of the Araz River is 102,000 km^{2}, where the 18,740 km^{2} or 18% of the river area belongs to Azerbaijan. The average annual flowrate of Araz River through Novruzlu (Saatli) settlement is 121 m^{3} / s or 3.82 km^{3}.

The river system of the republic consists of three groups: transboundary, border and local rivers. The transboundary (flowing through two or several countries) rivers include Kur, Ganikh (Alazan), Gabrirri (Iori), Khrami, Arpachay and others. Border rivers (which serve as the border between two or more countries) include the Araz, Samur, Bolgarchay and others. Local rivers are formed and flow within the territory of the Republic.

The water collection area is supplied by 2 large rivers of the Republic (Kur and Araz), 12 medium rivers, and other small rivers. Only 4 of the local rivers (Pirsaat, Hekericay, Tertçay, and Kurekchay) can be considered as medium rivers.

The mountain rivers flowing from the southern slope of the Greater Caucasus (Balakanchay, Talacay, Kurmukchay, Kishchay, Turyanchay, Goychay, Girdimanchay, etc.) are the left branches of the Kur river, however, flowing from the north-eastern slope (Gusarchay, Gudyalchay, Garachay, Valvalachay, etc.) and the Gobustan rivers (Sumqayitchay, Pirsaat, etc.) are the rivers directed into the Caspian Sea. Moreover, the rivers flowing from the north-eastern slope of the Lesser Caucasus (Zeyamchay, Shamkirchay, Goshagachay, Ganjachay, Kurekchay etc.) flowing from the Karabakh Range (Khachinchay, Terterchay, Gargarchay, etc.) are the right branches of the Kur, however, flowing from the Zangazur Range (Nakhchivanchay, Alinjaychay, Gilanchay, etc.) and the rivers flowing from the south-western slope of the Lesser Caucasus (Hekerichay, Guruchay, Kondalanchay etc.) are the left branches of the Araz River.

Lankaran rivers (Vishonchay, Lankaranchay, Tengerchay, Astarachay, etc.) are the rivers that flow into the Caspian Sea.

=== Lakes ===
Cumulative 450 lakes with a total area of 395 km^{2} were identified in Azerbaijan, where 10 lakes have area over 10 km^{2}.

The largest lake of the Republic is Sarısu lake, located in the Kur-Araz lowland (water area 65.7 km^{2}l its volume of water is 59.1 million m^{3}). The highest mountainous lake in the Republic is Tufangöl (area 0.01 km^{2}, with a volume of 0.11 million m^{3}) located in the basin of Damiraparanchay and at a height of 3277 m. Lake Goygol was formed in the middle stream of Aghsuchay after a strong earthquake in 1139.

== Natural Reserve ==
The Goy-gol State Reserve which is the first protection area in Azerbaijan was established in 1925. The Gizilagac and Zagatala Reserves in 1929, and the Hirkan Reserve was established in 1936. So, four reserves have been functioning until 1958. The process of reserve establishments has actively continued from 1958 to 1990. Altiagac State Reserve was established in 1990. As well as Shahbuz in Nakhchivan Autonomous Republic in 2003, Eldar Shamı in 2004, Mud Volcanoes group in Baku and Absheron Peninsula in 2007, and Korchay State Reserve in 2008. At the same time, the Reserve of Turyanchay, Pirgulu, Ilisu, Gara-Yaz, Ismayilli in 2003 and Zagatala State Reserves in 2008 were being expanded.

Natural reserves are home to fish of the Caspian Sea, rivers, water reservoirs, mainly the various species of animals spread in the mountainous areas, reptiles in the plains (especially the Caucasian viper, which has a very valuable poison), many birds and so on.

== Ministry of Ecology and Natural Resources ==
The Regulation on the Ministry of Ecology and Natural Resources of Azerbaijan was approved by Decree #583 of the Azerbaijani President on September 18, 2001.

According to the Regulation, the Ministry of Ecology and Natural Resources is the central executive body that implements state policy in the field of the protection of the environment, the use of natural resources, the rational utilization of underground waters, mineral raw materials and surface natural resources, their restoration, observation and prediction of hydrometeorological processes in the territory of the Republic, as well as In the section of the Caspian Sea (lake) belonging to the Azerbaijan.

== See also ==
- Petroleum industry in Azerbaijan
- Protected areas of Azerbaijan
- Nature of Azerbaijan
- National Parks of Azerbaijan
- State Game Reserves of Azerbaijan
- Environment of Azerbaijan
- Agriculture in Azerbaijan
- Metallurgy in Azerbaijan
