= State reserves of Azerbaijan =

System of nature preserves

State Reserves of Azerbaijan refers to the state reserves in Azerbaijan, which preserve the fauna, flora and their ecosystems.

State Reserves bear the status of governmental establishments aimed at environmental protection and scientific research. They are particularly designed for the protection of typical and rare natural complexes and studying of natural processes and phenomena. The utilization of the lands of State natural reserves, as well as animals and plants, found within their boundaries for industrial purposes is prohibited by the law. Activities in this sector are regulated by the Ministry of Ecology and Natural Resources of Azerbaijan Republic.

In total more than 10.2% of Azerbaijan is under protection by the government as state reserve.

== State Reserves ==
There are 15 state natural parks in Azerbaijan to preserve and protect the fauna, flora and their ecosystems. See below for the list:

- Basut-Chay State Reserve
- Eldar Pine State Reserve
- Gara-Yaz State Reserve
- Gizil-Agach State Reserve
- Gobustan State Reserve
- Ilisu State Reserve
- Ismailli State Reserve
- Pirgulu State Reserve
- Shahbuz State Reserve
- Shirvan State Reserve
- Shusha State Historical and Architectural Reserve
- Turian-Chay State Reserve
- Qaragol State Reserve
- Zagatala State Reserve

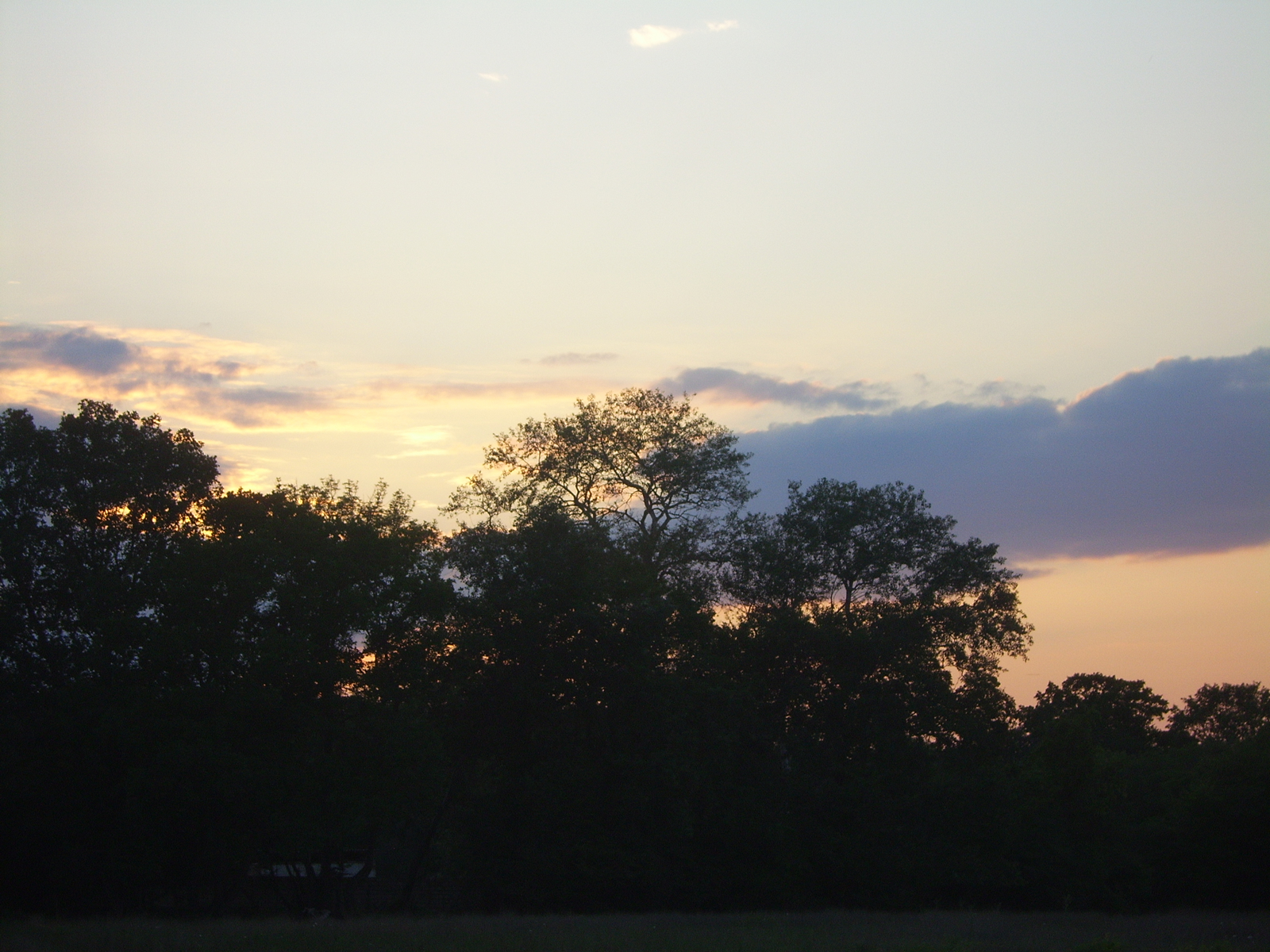
Forest near the Caspian Sea

=== Basut-Chay State Reserve ===
Basut-Chay State Reserve was established over 1.07 km^{2} in 1974 for preserving and protecting the rare Oriental plane-tree. The reserve covers the area around the Basut-Chay of the southeastern part of Minor Caucasus.

==== Plane-trees ====
The plane-trees make up 93.5% of Basut-Chay State Reserve area. On average, plane-trees live for 170 years. However, one can come across the plane-trees 1,200–1,500 years of age, 50 meters in height and 4 meters in diameter.

The Basut-Chay State Reserve is under the control of de facto Nagorno-Karabakh forces and does not operate at present.

=== Eldar Pine State Reserve ===
The Eldar Pine State Reserve was established on the area of 16.86 km^{2} of Samuh administrative region on December 16, 2004. The reserve is mainly designed for preserving and protecting of rare and endemic species of Eldar Pine tree.

In 1967 the reserve (with the area of 3.92 km^{2} was transformed into the branch of Goy-Gol State Reserve.

=== Gara-Yaz State Reserve ===
Gara-Yaz State Reserve was established on the area of 48.55 km^{2} in 1978 for protecting and restoring of riparian woodlands around the Kur. It mainly protects rare and endangered tugai ecological systems, occupying the lands in the mid stream of the Kur. Riparian woodlands includes such types of trees as white poplar, oak, alder-tree and white acacia. Among sharp-clawed animals the most widely spread are wild boar and deer, among birds; pheasant, thrush, dove, etc.

The area of Gara-Yaz State Reserve was expanded by 48.03 km^{2} up to 96.58 km^{2} on June 2, 2003.

=== Gizil-Agach State Reserve ===
Gizil-Agach State Reserve was established on the area of 884 km^{2} south-west of the Caspian Sea shore for the purpose of protecting, creating conditions for wintering and nesting of migrant, swamp and wild birds in 1929.

The reserve was included of the list of UNESCO Ramseur convention "On internationally important swampy areas as the birds' residing places". The most species of birds included into the Red Book of Azerbaijan are found in the reserve and adjacent areas. The reserve accounts for 248 species of birds. Such mammals as wild boar, wolf, wild cat, badger, sable, fox, etc. populate this reserve. There are 54 fish species in the water basins of this reserve.

=== Gobustan State Reserve ===
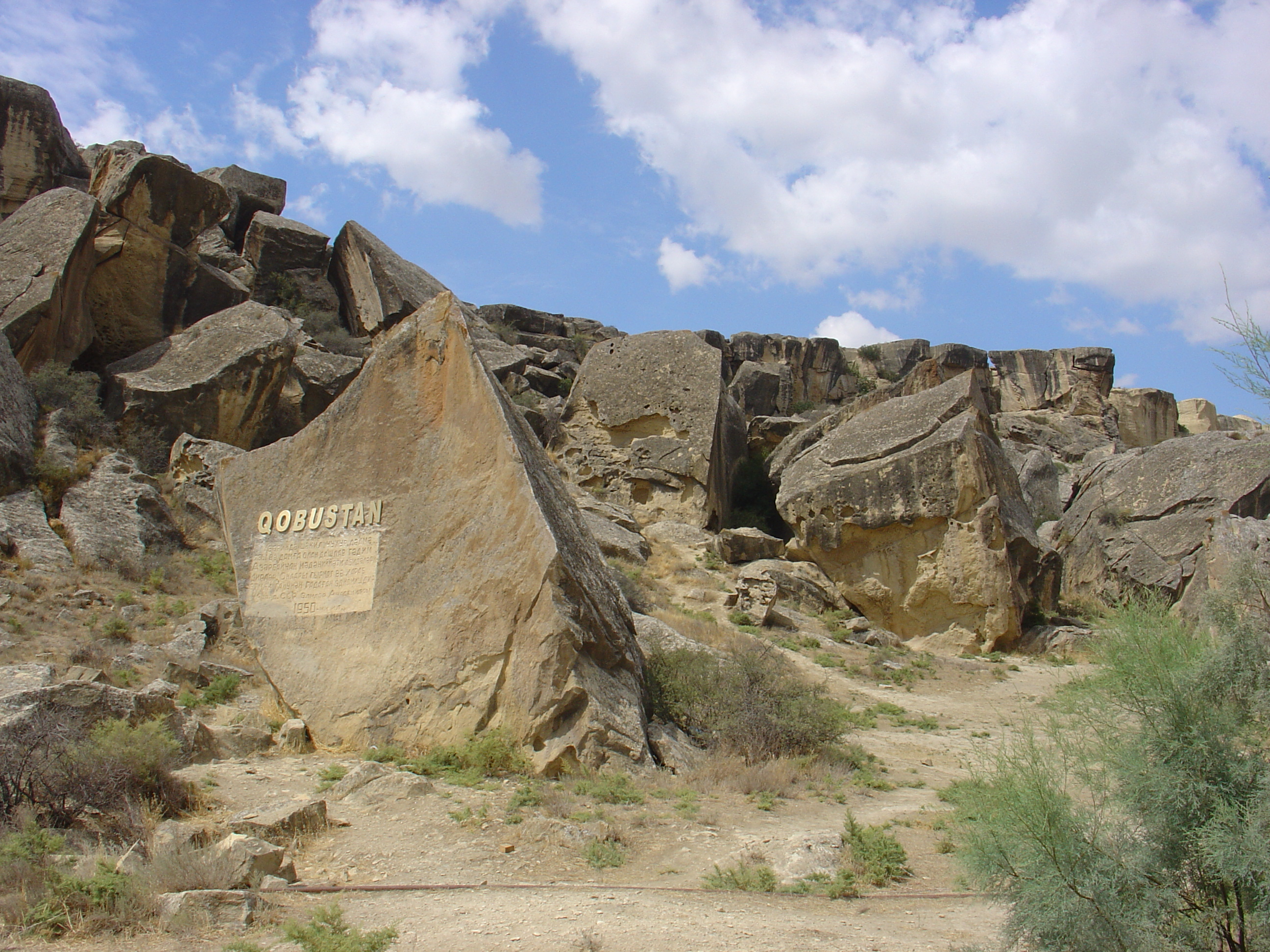
Gobustan is amongst the most unusual places on Earth.

Gobustan State Reserve was established in 1966 when the region was declared as a national historical landmark of Azerbaijan in an attempt to preserve the ancient carvings, mud volcanoes and gas-stones in the region.

Gobustan State Reserve is very rich in archeological monuments, the reserve has more than 600,000 rock paintings, which depict primitive men, animals, battle-pieces, ritual dances, bullfights, boats with armed oarsmen, warriors with lances in their hands, camel caravans, pictures of sun and stars, on the average dating back to 5,000–20,000 years.

==== Mud volcanoes ====
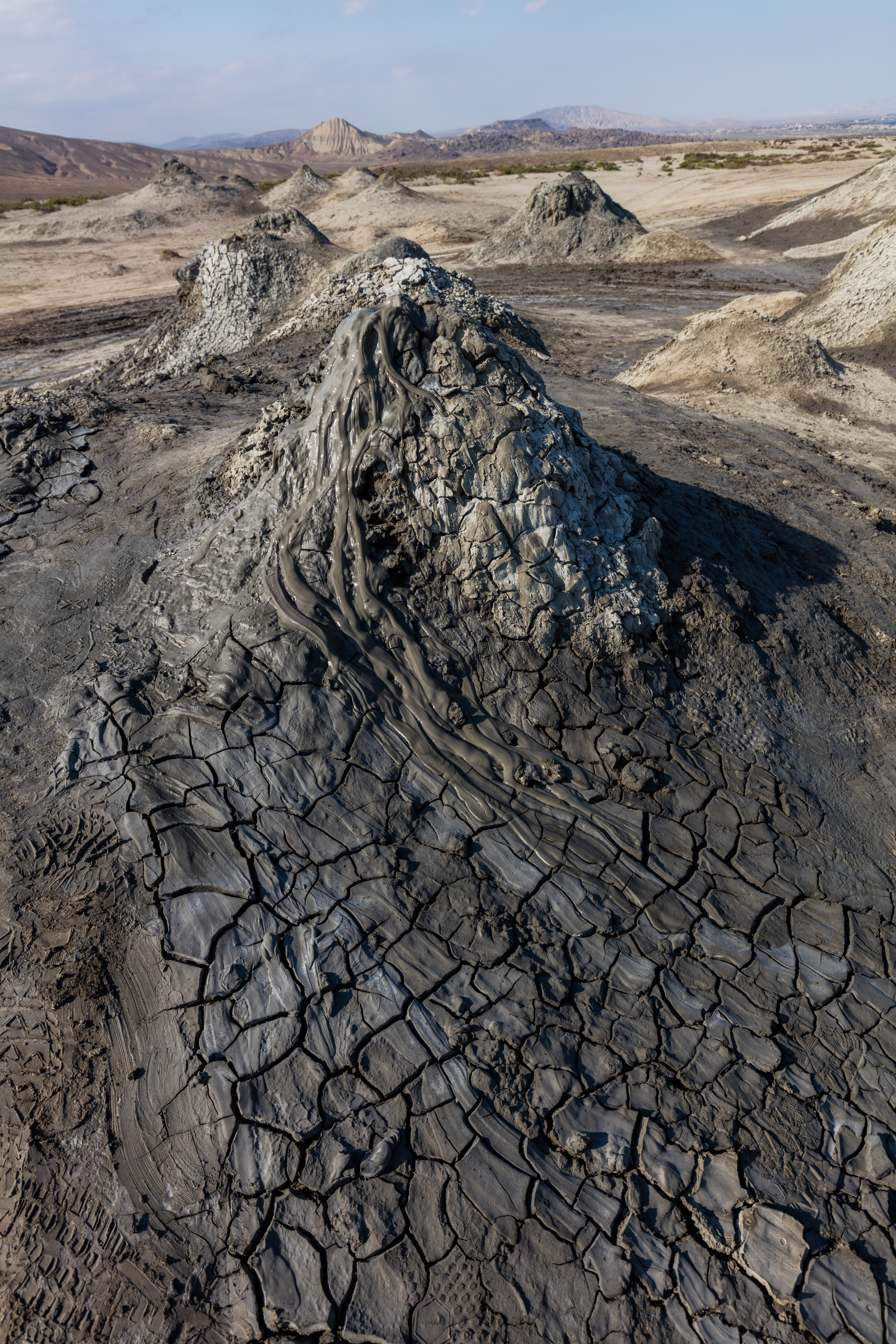
Mud volcano in Gobustan

It's estimated that 300 of the planet's estimated 700 mud volcanoes sit in Gobustan, Azerbaijan and the Caspian Sea. Many geologists as well as locals and international mud tourists trek to such places as the Firuz Crater, Gobustan, Salyan and end up happily covered in mud which is thought to have medicinal qualities. In 2001 one mud volcano 15 kilometers from Baku made world headlines when it suddenly started spewing flames 15 meters high.

==== Gaval Dash ====
The Gaval Dash is a natural musical stone which can only be found in Gobustan, Azerbaijan. Among the stone books there are a big flat stone formed out of 3 supports. Suffice it to touch the object with a small stone, melodious sounds come from it. The stone is called Gaval Dash, the sound can be compared with a tambourine. The Gaval Dash have been formed due to the unique climate, oil and gas which can be found in the region of Azerbaijan.

Gobustan is the most visited state reserve in Azerbaijan.

=== Ilisu State Reserve ===
Ilisu State Reserve was established on the area of 93 km^{2} in 1987. It aims to protect natural complexes of southern slopes of Major Caucasus, to preserve rare and endangered flora and fauna, to restore forests and prevent erosion of soil and flood. The reserve accounts for 500 plant species with nearly 60 species of endemic ones. One can come across such animals as roe deer, mountain buffalo, wild boar, squirrel, chamois, etc.

The territory of Ilisu State Reserve was expanded up to 173.816 km^{2} in March 2003.

=== Ismailli State Reserve ===
Ismailli State Reserve was established on the area of 57.78 km^{2} in 1981 for preservation and protection of natural complexes, occupying the north part of southern slope of Major Caucasus.

The area of the reserve was expanded by 109.6 km^{2} and brought to 167 km^{2} in June 2003.

Forests are mainly formed by such tree types as beech, hornbeam and oak, the small number of birch-tree, cud, lime-tree, etc. Among them are chestnut-leaved oak and horehound oak of the Tertiary period were included into the Red Book of Azerbaijan. The reserve accounts for nearly 170 animal species. 104 bird species of 13 orders are found in this reserve. Such mammals as brown bear, wild cat, lynx, Caucasian dear, roe dear, chamois, Caucasian goat, etc. populate the reserve.

=== Pirgulu State Reserve ===
Pirgulu State Reserve was established on the area of 15.21 km^{2} in 1968 for protecting mountain forests, herbage of different kinds, fertile soil, expanding forest areas, preventing air pollution that has a negative impact on astroclimate. The flora of the reserve includes over 60 species. One can come across such mammals as brown bear, wolf, forest cat, lynx, weasel, wild boar, roe deer, etc.

The area of Pirgulu State Reserve was expanded by 27.53 km^{2} and reached 42.74 km^{2} in 2003.

=== Shahbuz State Reserve ===
Shahbuz State Reserve was created on the area of 31.39 km^{2} of Shahbuz administrative district of Nakhchivan (autonomous republic of Azerbaijan) by a decree of President of Azerbaijan on June 16, 2003. The area of Batabat lake is mainly surrounded by grassland. Medicinal herbs, oak trees etc. dominate the flora of the area. The most widely spread animals are partridge, broad-tailed nightingale, among mammals-brown bear, badger, lynx, etc.

It was established in June 2003 for the purpose of protecting rare and endangered species of plants and animals.

=== Shirvan State Reserve ===
Shirvan State Reserve was established on the area of 177.45 km^{2} of a part of Bendovan State Game reserve in 1969 for the purpose of protecting and increasing the number of water birds. The area of the reserve was expanded to 258 km^{2} in 1982. Water reserves account for 35,000 m^{2} of the area.

The reserves is characterized by rich ornithological fauna. Rare and valuable birds nest and winter in the swampy areas. The largest part of the reserve was transferred to the Shirvan National Park in 2003 and the area of the reserve currently totals 62.32 km^{2}.

Shirvan State Reserve composed 62.32 km^{2}.

=== Turian-Chay State Reserve ===
Turian-Chay State Reserve was established on the area of 126.3 km^{2} in 1958 for the purposes of protection and restoration of arid forest complexes in Bozdagh and prevention of erosion processes in the mountainous slopes.

The reserve area was expanded to 225 km^{2} in January 2003. Three types of juniper (flavor, red and polycarpous), Georgian oak, cud, pomegranate, etc., can be found in the reserve. It also has 24 species of mammals, 112 birds, 20 reptiles and 3 Amphibians.

=== Gara-Gel State Reserve ===
Gara-Gel State Reserve was established on the area of 2.4 km^{2} in 1987 for protection and preservation of rare ecological system of the lake of glacial origin and natural complexes surrounding the water basin. The lake feeds mainly from rains and spring water. The flora of the reserve comprises plants of 278 races, 68 breeds and over 100 species. The trout was brought to the lake in 1967.

Gara-Gel State Reserve is occupied by Armenian forces and does not operate at present.

=== Zagatala State Reserve ===
Zagatala State Reserve was established in an area of 252 km^{2} of Zagatala and Balakan districts in the central part of southern slopes of the Caucasus; in Azerbaijan.

The territory of the reserve has been altered for several times and gradually reached 238 km^{2}. The reserve aims to protect Sub-Alpine plants of southern slopes of the Major Caucasus and the natural complexes of Alpine and nival zones. The reserve is famous for such ancient plants as rhododendron, cherry-laurel, blackberry, maple, fern, etc. It also has a rich fauna, that includes among others the Caucasian mountain buffalo, fox, forest cat, lynx, squirrel, weasel, etc. are found in this reserve.

In 2005–2006 there were suggestions to expand the reserve territory of the Zagatala State Reserve. The Ministry of Ecology and Natural Resources had announced that they had confirmed to expand Zagatala State Reserve in 2007.

== Expansions ==
Azerbaijan has taken drastic measures to improve the ecology of the country. More than 10 new reserves were created in order to protect and preserve the nature. Below is a list of the expanded reserves with the size of the expanded area:

- The area of Ilisu State Reserve was expanded by 93 km^{2} up to 173.816 km^{2} in 2003.
- The area of Ismailli State Reserve was expanded by 109.6 km^{2} and brought to 167 km^{2} in 2003.
- The area of Gara-Yaz State Reserve was expanded by 48.03 km^{2} up to 96.58 km^{2} in 2003.
- The area of Pirgulu State Reserve was expanded by 27.53 km^{2} and reached 42.74 km^{2} in 2003.

== See also ==
- Protected areas of Azerbaijan
- Nature of Azerbaijan
- National Parks of Azerbaijan
- State Game Reserves of Azerbaijan
- List of historical reserves in Azerbaijan
