= Shirvan State Reserve =

Protected area in Azerbaijan

Coordinates: 39°36′02″N 49°07′38″E

Shirvan State Reserve in Azerbaijan was established on the area of 177.45 square kilometres (68.51 sq mi) of a part of Bendovan State Game reserve in 1969 for the purpose of protecting and increasing the number of water birds. The area of the reserve was expanded to 258 square kilometres (25,800 ha) in 1982.

== Ecology ==
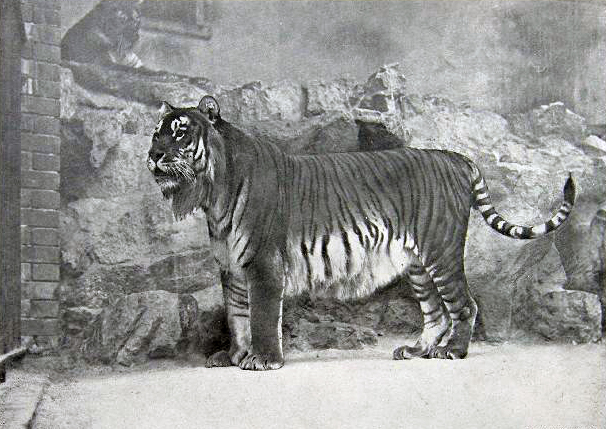
The Caspian tiger, which used to occur in the Caucasus, but is now extinct.

The reserves is characterized by rich ornithological fauna. Water reserves account for 35 square kilometres (14 sq mi) of the area. Rare birds nest and winter in the swampy areas. The largest part of the reserve was transferred to the Shirvan National Park in 2003, and the area of the reserve currently totals 62.32 square kilometres (24.06 sq mi).

== Etymology ==
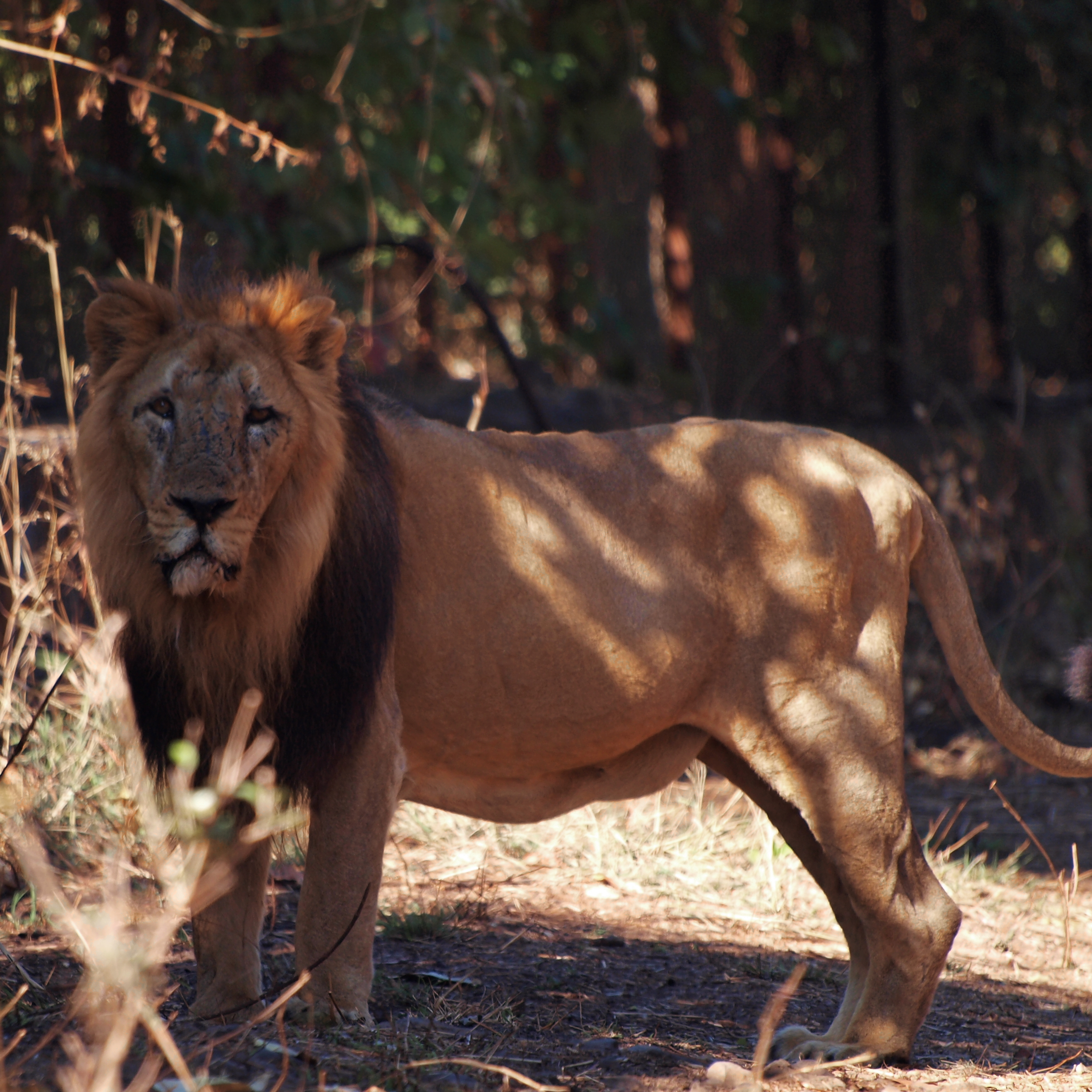
The Asiatic lion, now extinct in the Caucasus.

The names of the reserve and national park appear to be derived from the word Shīr (Persian: شیر, 'Lion'). The Asiatic lion used to occur in the Trans-Caucasus, including this area, before the end of the 10th century. A reason for its extinction here is that it was hunted by hunters, including 'shirvans' or 'shirvanshakhs', who were native to the Trans-Caucasus.

== See also ==
- Nature of Azerbaijan
- National Parks of Azerbaijan
- State Reserves of Azerbaijan
- State Game Reserves of Azerbaijan
