= Zagatala State Reserve =

Reserve
- Zagatala State Reserve
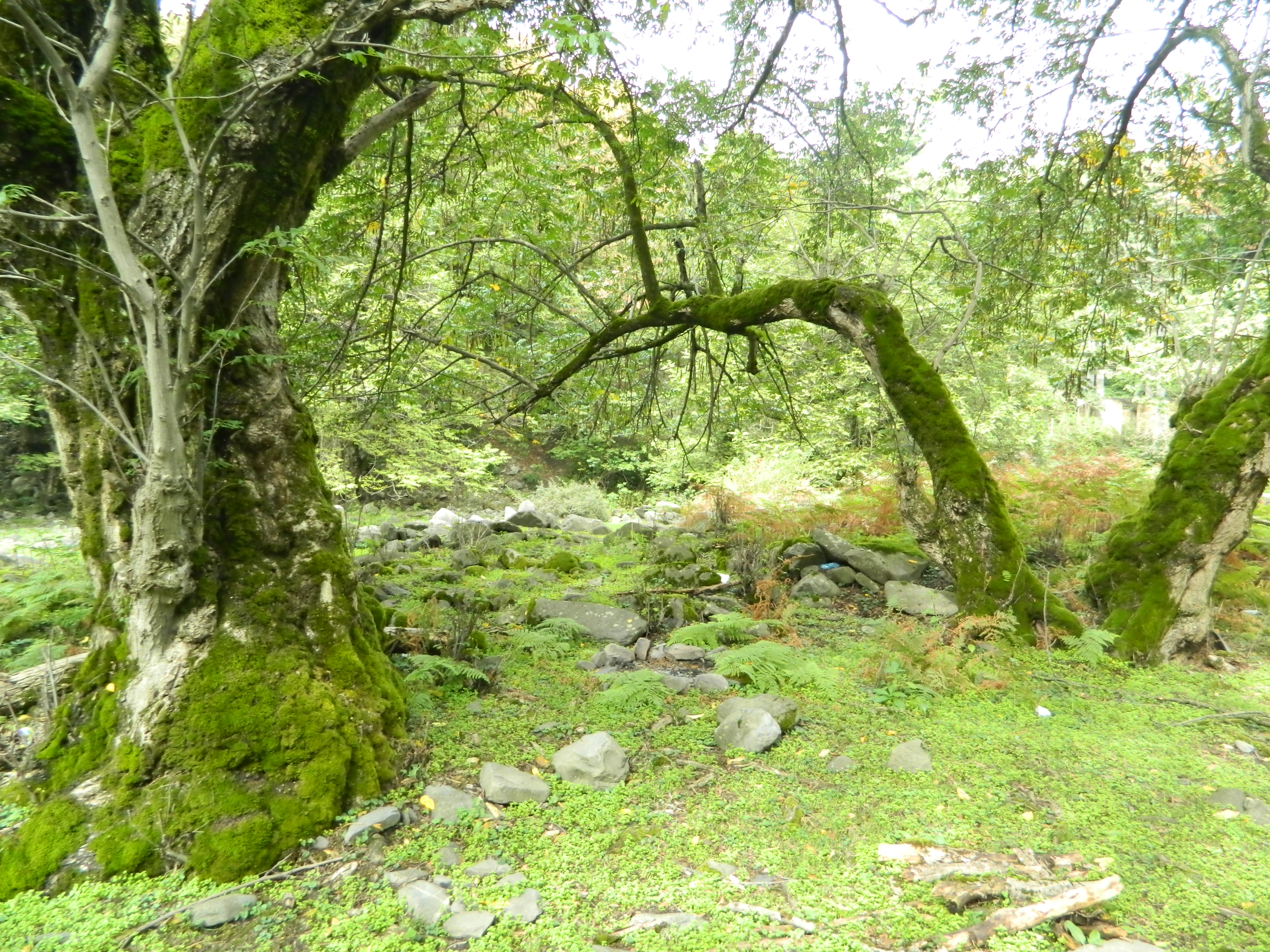

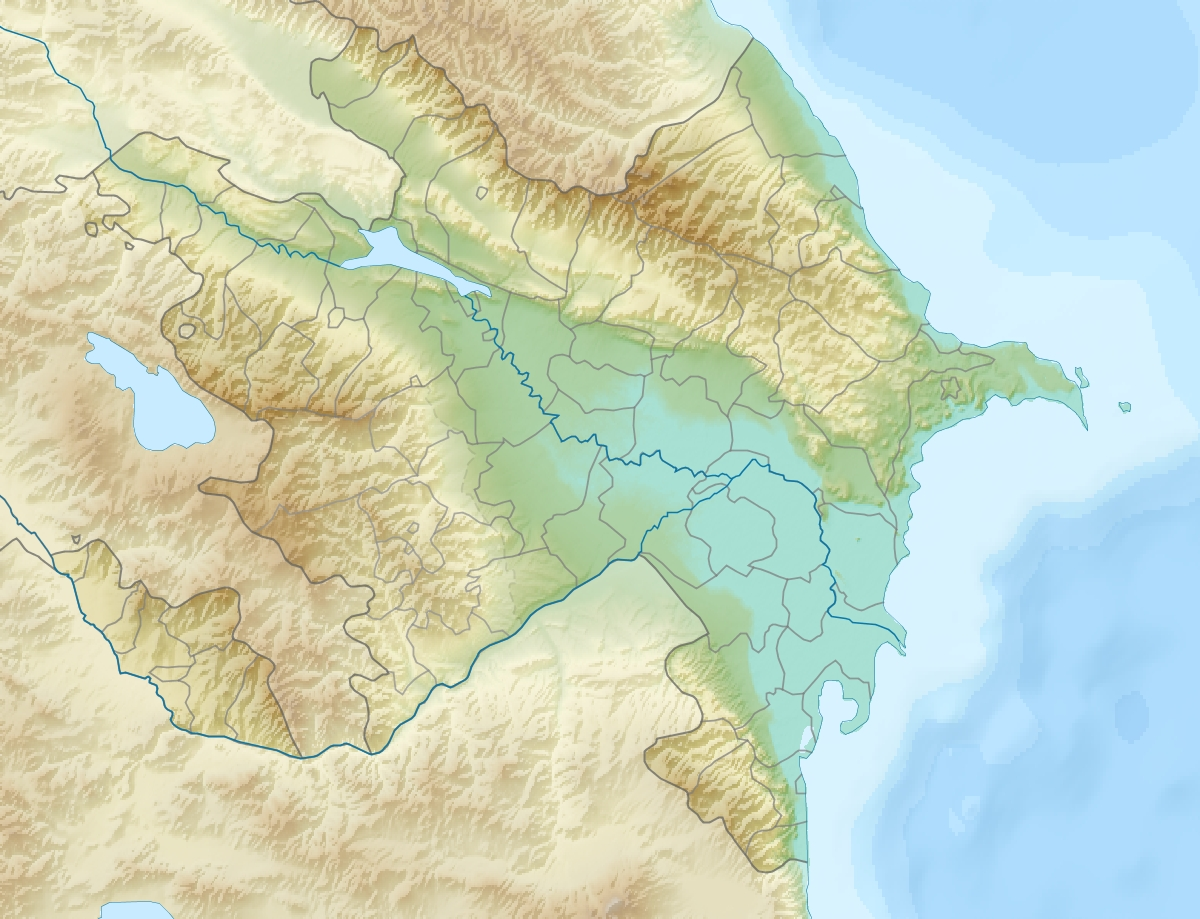

- Location within Azerbaijan
- Coordinates: 41°48′07″N 46°37′40″E
- Country: Azerbaijan

Government
  - Body: Ministry of Ecology and Natural Resources of Azerbaijan Republic

Area
  - Total: 25,200 ha (62,000 acres)

Zagatala State Nature Reserve (Azerbaijani: Zaqatala Dövlət Qoruğu) – is a reserve in the Zagatala and Balakan districts of Azerbaijan. It was established in 1929 in the middle part of the southern foothills of the Greater Caucasus Mountains in the territory of Zagatala and Balakan districts on an area of 25,200 hectares. It is located on the eastern slopes of the Greater Caucasus Range in Azerbaijan. Zagatala Reserve was established in 1930, as a separate reserve together with the Balakan Reserve. The height of the reserve varies from 650 to 3646 m above sea level. The flora of the base of the reserve consists of mountain forests and mountain meadows. More than a thousand species of modern flora are observed here. [2] The territory of the reserve has changed many times and now stands at 28,844 hectares. There are more than 900 plant species in the reserve, which is 1/6 of the flora of Azerbaijan. More than 60% of the reserve area consists of broadleaf forests. The main purpose of the reserve is to protect the natural complexes of rare plants on the southern slopes of the Greater Caucasus Mountains.

== Overview ==
Zagatala SNR was established in the areas of Zagatala and Balakan districts of Azerbaijan in 1929 on an area of 23,844 hectares on the southern slope of the middle part of the Greater Caucasus mountain range with the aim of preserving and studying plants and animals spread in the southern parts of the Greater Caucasus. According to the decision of the Cabinet of Ministers of Azerbaijan dated 17 October 2008, its area was expanded by adding the lands of Zagatala and Balakan forest protection and rehabilitation facilities and reached 47,349 hectares. The altitude of the reserve is 650–1646 m above sea level.

== Ecology ==
Flora – Oak, hornbeam, beech, elm, linden, ash, chestnut, walnut, bear hazel, and birch trees. Iron, black currant, cornel, maple, cherry, yellow rhododendron, gandalash and other shrubs are widespread in the forests of the reserve. There are beech trees 200–250 years old and up to 30 m high.

Fauna – Twelve species of plants distributed in the reserve, lynx and caper from mammals, large hawks from birds, eagles, Caucasians, Caucasian tetras are included in the Red Book of Azerbaijan, the Caucasian falcon, which feeds on birds of prey, is included in the IUCN Red List. There is a nature museum under the reserve. There are Dagestan mountain goats, roe deer, wild boar, bear, badger, fox, forest cat, lynx, squirrel, doll, etc. settled. One of the most important issues of the day is the expansion of the territory of the Zagatala State Nature Reserve and the creation of a biosphere state nature reserve. The Ministry of Ecology and Natural Resources of Azerbaijan has submitted a petition to the Cabinet of Ministers.

Rivers – Three large, abundant rivers flow through the reserve – Mazimchay, Balakenchay and Katekhchay. These rivers originate from the peaks of the Greater Caucasus Mountains and flow into the Alazan River through the Alazan-Ayrichay valley.

The banks of the Katekh River, which flows through the territory of Zagatala, are surrounded by hard rocks and cliffs on both sides of the reserve. A therapeutic sulphate-mineral spring boils at the confluence of the Rochigelchay and Kilsachay rivers, which are tributaries of the Katekhchay. A small plateau was formed near this spring. There are ruins of a very ancient church on that plateau. Along the course of the church, there is a very large Pichigel Cave, about 800–1000 meters from these ruins. Reserve workers use the cave to spend the night. The exterior of the cave is very attractive and beautiful, the structure of monolithic rocks above the cave extends towards the river, and at the edges of this structure, there is a "wall" of evergreen vines. 200–250 people are comfortably accommodated in the cave. It is always dry here. The cave is surrounded by beech, hornbeam, plane, linden, elm and others. Ancient broad-leaved forests of tree species.

In front of a church, in the Katekhchay river, a waterfall is formed. In this waterfall, water flowed from a height of 20 meters in a narrow rocky ravine. This waterfall is called Gabizdere or Zagatala waterfall.

In general, there are about 10 waterfalls in the territory of Zagatala State Nature Reserve and 15–17 different sulphate-mineral springs are boiling.

== See also ==
- Environment of Azerbaijan
- List of protected areas of Azerbaijan
- National parks of Azerbaijan
- State reserves of Azerbaijan
