= Gara-Gel State Reserve =

Protected area in Azerbaijan

Coordinates: 39°47′05″N 46°00′22″E

Gara-Gel State Reserve or Qaragol State Reserve was established on the area of 240 hectares in 1987 for protection and preservation of rare ecological system of the lake of glacial origin and natural complexes surrounding the water basin. The lake feeds mainly from rains and spring water. Lake Ishigli-Gara-Gel is situated at a height of 2, 658 m above sea level in the southern part of the Karabakh volcanic plateau near the foothills of several mountains with a height of 3, 200-3, 500 m. the lake is a relict water reservoir, which was formed in the crater of an extinct volcano. The length of the lake is 1,950 m, its maximum width is 1, 250 m, length of its coastline is 5, 500 m, maximum depth – 7.8 m, volume of water – 10 million m3, area of the lake 13 km2. Water flow is mainly due to melted snow and rainwater, partially spring water. In terms of botany and geography the Karabakh Plateau is situated between the Caucasian and Armenian-Iran provinces, which determines the specifics of the local flora. The flora of the reserve includes 102 species and subspecies of vascular plants from 68 general and 27 families. The lack of flora is explained by the fact that the reserve covers only the lake, and many rare and endemic species grow beyond the reserve area, but close to its borders. The vegetation of the coastal area of the lake is represented mainly by meadows with the dominance of Trifolium and Tragacantha and Astragalus. The swamp flora and vegetation are limited because of the height of the area. There are only two species of plants in the lake: Polygonum amphibium and Ranunclus. In 1967, a type of Sevan trout, included in the Red Book, was introduced into the lake. The reserve is an inter-republic reserve. The reserve is under occupation. Adjacent to the borders of the reserve there are areas with rare and endangered species of plants such as Euphrasia, Potentilla and others.

Gara-Gel State Reserve is under the control of Armenian forces and does not operate at present.

== See also ==
- Nature of Azerbaijan
- National Parks of Azerbaijan
- State reserves of Azerbaijan
- State Game Reserves of Azerbaijan
