= Environment of Azerbaijan =

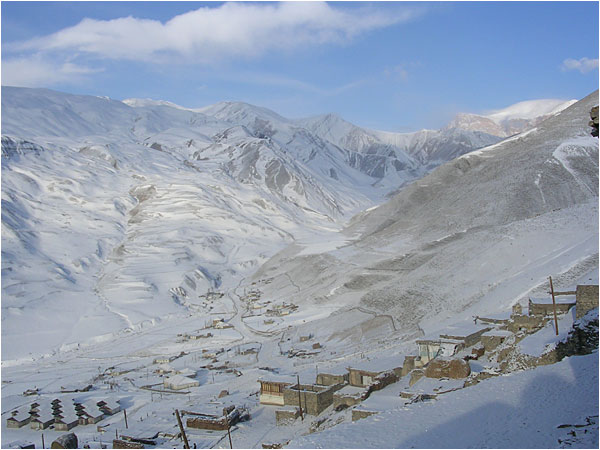
Mountains near the highest village in Azerbaijan, Khinalyg

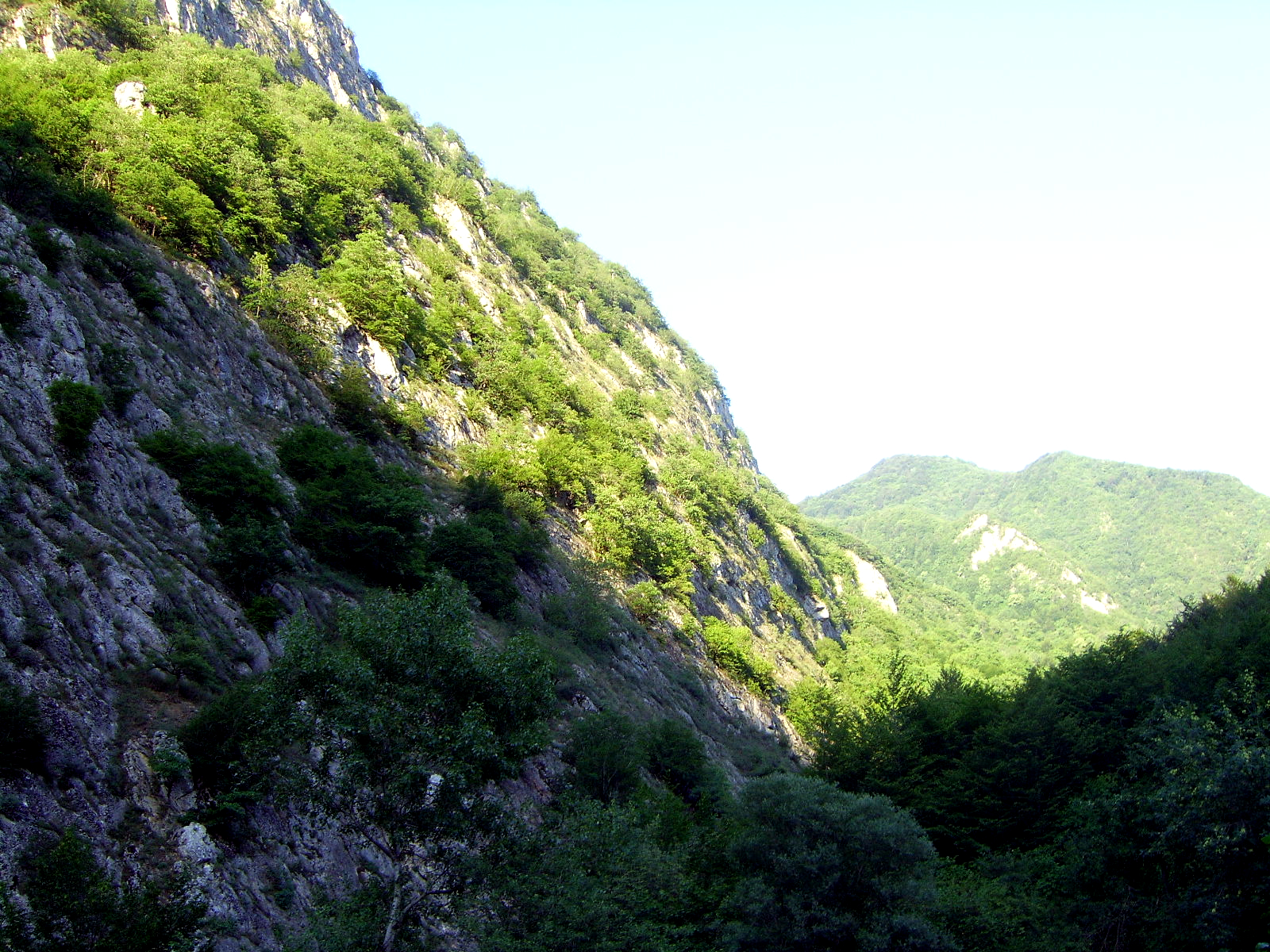
Mountains of Tangaalti near Quba

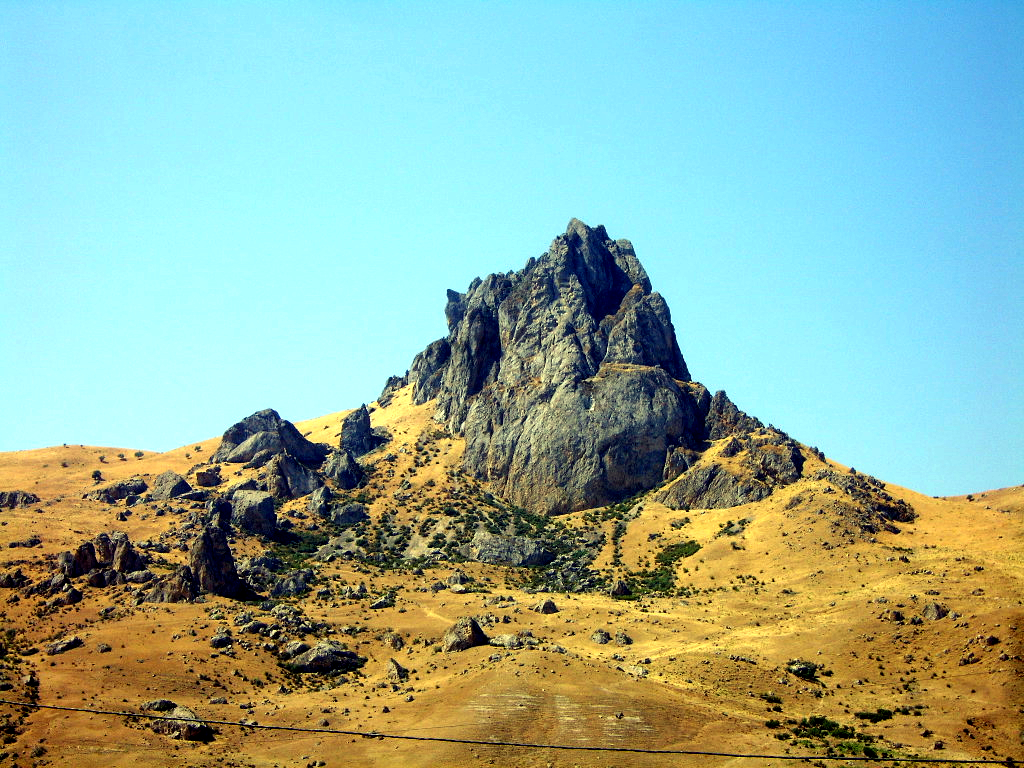
Besh Barmag Mountain (Five Finger Mountain) is located in Absheron, Azerbaijan.

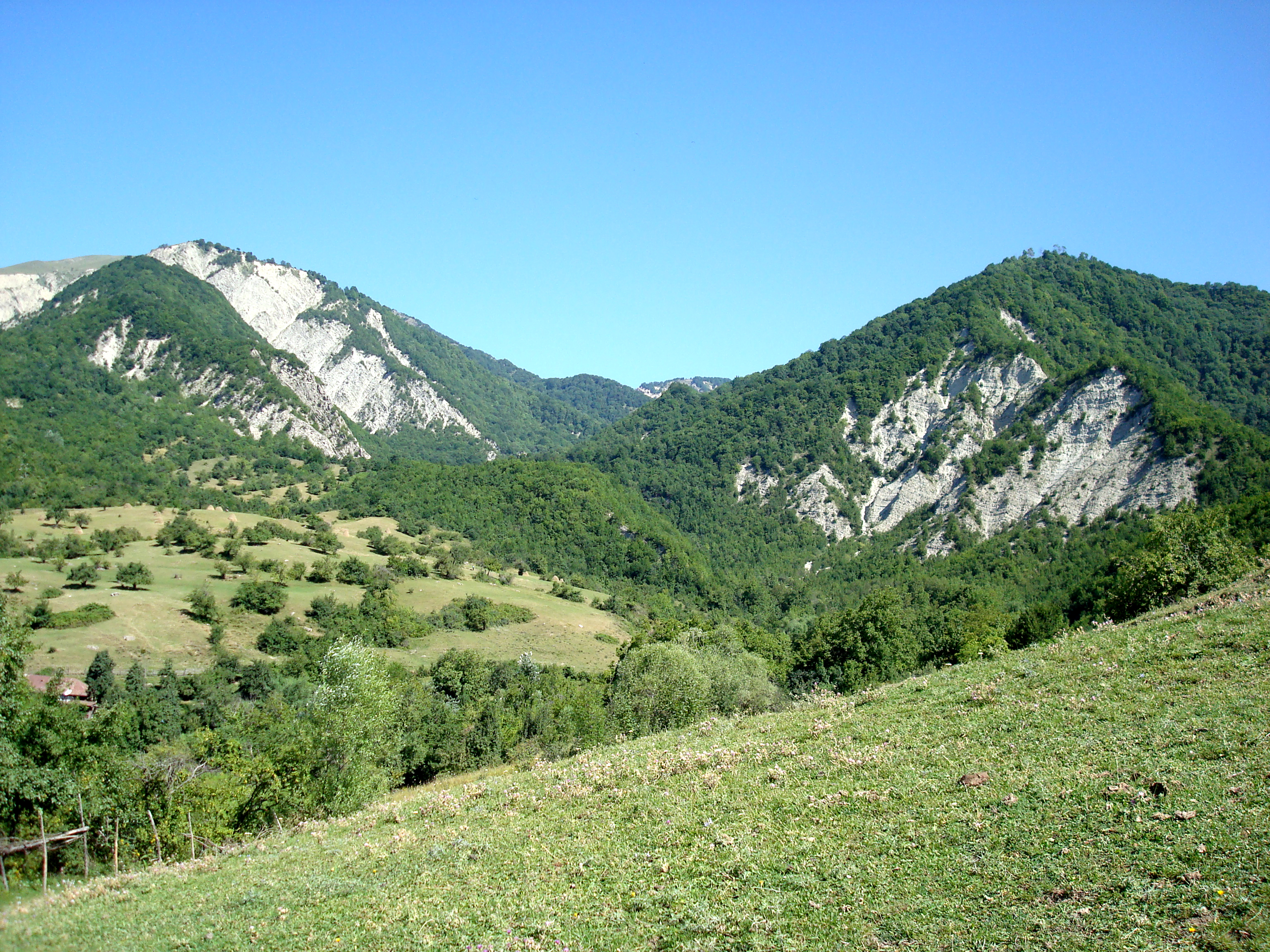
Ismailli State Reserve in Azerbaijan

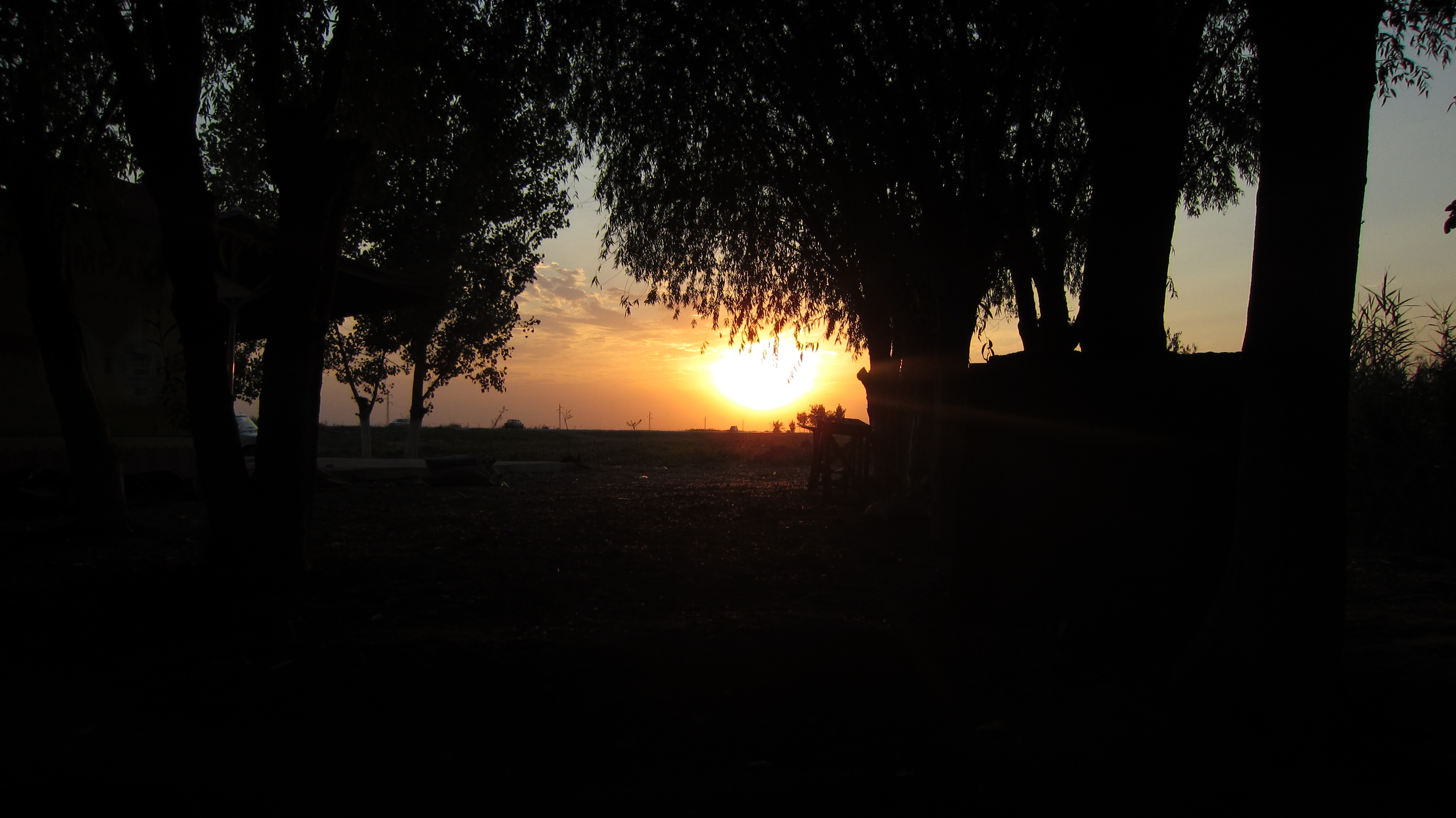
Kürdəmir sunset

The environment of Azerbaijan includes a wide diversity of climates, animals, plants, and habitats.

== National protection ==
Due to the tapping of oil reserves in the early 20th century, Azerbaijan has had sufficient resources to develop an industrial sector, which in turn led to a significant increase in pollution. Under the centrally planned Soviet command economy, Baku became an industrialized capital city. Moscow could, for example, order that all air conditioners in the Soviet Union be built in Azerbaijan, such arbitrary and unilateral control of industrial output often led to environmental neglect and increased pollution, which caused serious damage to nature within Azerbaijan.

Since the independence of Azerbaijan, the Azerbaijani government has taken drastic measures to preserve the unique nature of Azerbaijan. But national protection of Azeri nature started truly functioning after 2001 when the state budget increased due to new revenues provided by the Baku-Tbilisi-Ceyhan pipeline. Within the last four years, protected nature areas doubled to is equal to eight percent of the country's territory. The measures taken by the president were applauded by foreign organizations; in fact, President Ilham Aliyev was awarded Germany Mikhail Zhukov Fund's prize for his successful ecological policy on 19 October 2006.

Since 2001 the government has set up seven large reserves and almost doubled the sector of the budget earmarked for environmental protection.

On October 4, 2016, Azerbaijani officials announced their plans for further improvement of the ecological situation in Baku Bay, which will take place during 2016–2020.

=== State Reserves of Azerbaijan ===
Lion's View in Gobustan

The state-run nature reserves aim to protect nature, wildlife and the environment. They allow scientists to conduct natural research. They are specifically designed for the protection of common and rare species of flora and fauna. Azeri law strictly prohibits industrial development or meddling with animals or plants within the borders of the state parks.

There are 16 state natural parks in Azerbaijan that preserve and protect the fauna, flora and their ecosystems. See below for the list:

- Ag-Gel State Reserve
- Basut-Chay State Reserve
- Eldar Pine State Reserve
- Gara-Yaz State Reserve
- Gizil-Agach State Reserve
- Gobustan State Reserve
- Ilisu State Reserve
- Ismailli State Reserve
- Pirgulu State Reserve
- Shahbuz State Reserve
- Shirvan State Reserve
- Turian-Chay State Reserve
- Qaragol State Reserve
- Zagatala State Reserve

=== National parks ===
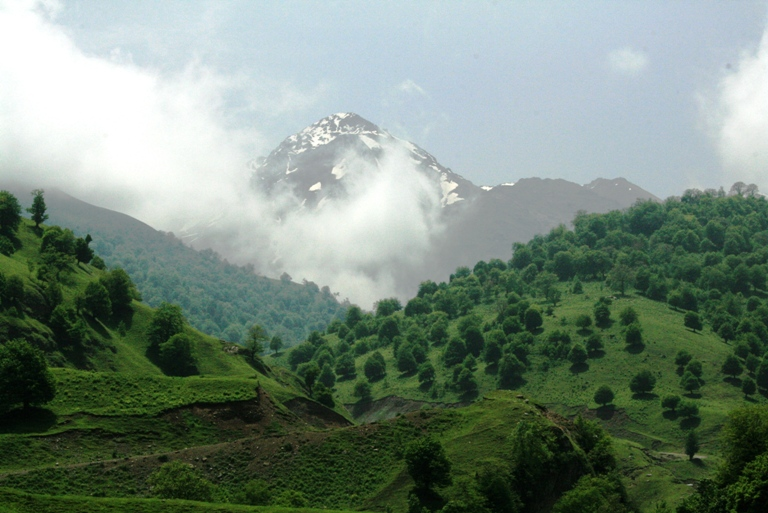
Murov mountain in Azerbaijan

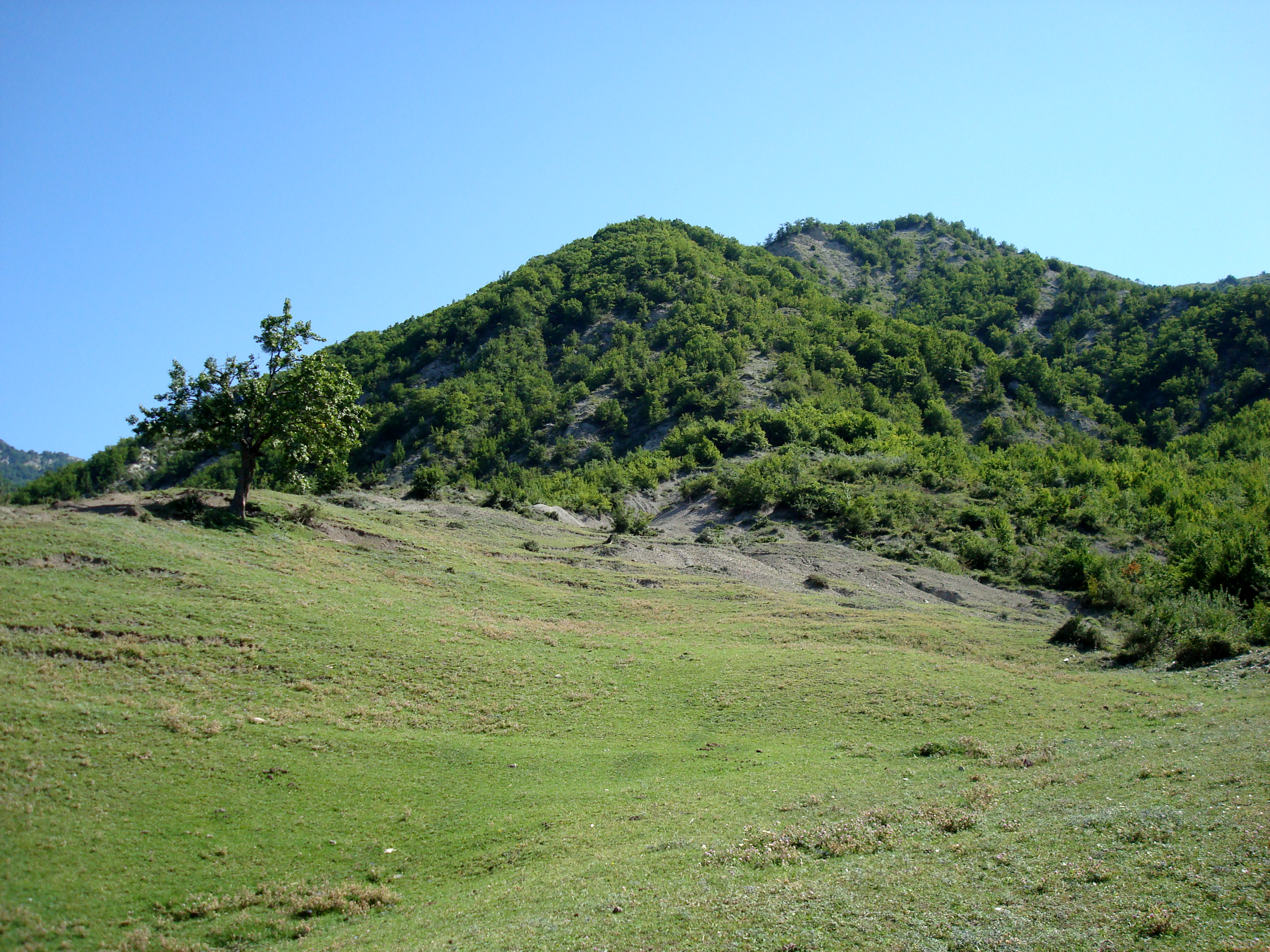
Ismailli Reserve in Azerbaijan

National Parks of Azerbaijan refers to the National Parks in the territory of Azerbaijan. National Parks have peculiarities and ensure a strong security system and all favorable conditions for animals living within the park. National Parks in Azerbaijan are restricted tourism zones but are open for observation of the natural processes. Ecotourism and other infrastructural constructions are currently being established in the national parks of Azerbaijan.

As a country located in both the Caucasus and Asia Minor, between the Black and Caspian Seas, Azerbaijan has a rich natural culture, and the widest biodiversity of all the European states and has enormous natural resources. The natural reserves play a crucial role in the preservation of this biodiversity.

Azerbaijan has a total of 7 national parks, 13 state natural parks and 21 reserves, which can be seen here below. A seventh national park the Shakhdag National Park was established in 2008, Shakhdag is the largest national park in the Caucasus and one of the largest in Europe.

- Absheron National Park
- Ag-Gol National Park
- Altyaghach National Park
- Göygöl National Park
- Hirkan National Park
- Shakhdag National Park
- Shirvan National Park
- Zangezur National Park

=== State Natural Game Reserve ===
Game Reserves are reserves with the purpose of maintaining wildlife. Some game reserves also allow hunting. The State Game Reserves in Major Caucasus in Azerbaijan are:

- State Game Reserve of Shaki
- State Game Reserve of Qusar
- State Game Reserve of Qabala
- State Game Reserve of Ismailly
- State Game Reserve of Qakh

The natural complexes with the Minor Caucasus are:

- State Game Reserve of Qubadly
- State Game Reserve of Lachyn
- State Game Reserve of Dashalty
- State Game Reserve of Qyzyldja
- State Game Reserve of Arazboyu

Four State Game Reserves of Azerbaijan (Lachyn, Gubadly, Dashalty, Arazboylu with a total area of about 440 km^{2}) are not currently operating as a result of the Armenian occupation of Azerbaijani territories.

== Orography ==
Azerbaijan is home to a vast variety of landscapes. Over half of Azerbaijan's land mass consists of mountain ridges, crests, yailas and plateaus which rise up to hypsometric levels of 400–1,000 meters (including the Middle and Lower lowlands), in some places (Talis, Jeyranchol-Ajinohur and Langabiz-Alat foreranges) up to 100–120 metres, and others from 0 – 50 meters and up (Gobustan, Absheron). The rest of Azerbaijan's terrain consist of plains and lowlands. Hypsometric marks within the Caucasus region vary from about -28 metres at the Caspian Sea shoreline up to 4466 metres at Mount Bazardüzü.

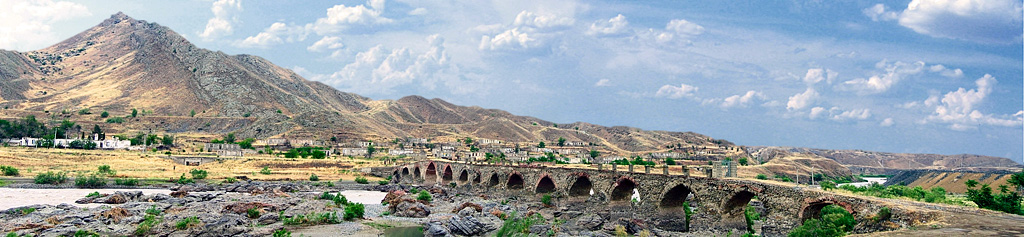
Partial view of the Khudafarin Bridge in Azerbaijan

== Geology ==
The geology of Azerbaijan forms a constituent geological part of the Alpine folded belt. Sedimentary deposits embracing the southwestern parts of the Major and Minor Caucasus, including the intermountain Kur-River trough, as well as the Mid- and South Caspian basins consist of diversity fold systems. The Earth's crust thickness in Azerbaijan varies in the range from 38 to 55 km. Its maximum thickness is observed in the Minor Caucasus area, while its minimum thickness is typical for the Talysh foothills. Geological setting of the area consists of sedimentary, volcanic-sedimentary, volcanic and terrestrial deposits embracing almost entire stratigraphic range beginning from pre-Cambrian period up to Holocene time.

== Climate ==
The climate of Azerbaijan is unique, as nine of the Earth's eleven climate zones are found in Azerbaijan, although sitting in the temperate zone.

Temperature, precipitation, humidity, evaporation and cloudiness all influence the landscape and climate of Azerbaijan.

The climate varies considerably from east to west. In the western mountains, the weather is drier and more extreme. The eastern part of Azerbaijan, near the Caspian Sea, has a more moderate climate. As a predominantly mountainous country, Azerbaijan is surrounded by the Greater Caucasus, Lesser Caucasus, Talysh Mountains and North Iranian Mountains.

All these aspects create a unique climate in Azerbaijan.

== Flora ==
Azerbaijan has a rich flora, over 4,500 species of plants have been classified in the country. Due to the unique climate in Azerbaijan, flora is much richer – based on the number of species – than that of other republics of the South Caucasus. About two thirds of all of the species present in the entire Caucasus region can be found in Azerbaijan.

== Fauna ==
Azerbaijan has an amazingly rich and diverse fauna. The first reports of the diversity of animal life in Azerbaijan can be found in travel notes of Eastern travelers. Animal carvings on architectural monuments, ancient rocks and stones survived up to the present times.

There are 106 species of mammals, 97 species of fish, 363 species of birds, 10 species of amphibians and 52 species of reptiles which have been recorded and classified in Azerbaijan.

The natural habitat of various types of animals varies within the country. Some species only populate special restricted areas (lakes, parts of mountainous areas) while others are spread throughout the country. For example, passerines can be found anywhere in the territory of Azerbaijan. Protozoa parasites are also registered in all areas of the country, depending on natural habitat of carrier animals such as cattle and poultry. Among mammals, jeyran gazelles populate plain areas, Caucasian goats inhabit the Major Caucasus areas, most species of birds can be found in forests, some in water basins. Some insects occupy agricultural fields, while others are only present in defined ecosystems.

A number of animal species are protected from hunting within the natural reserves of Azerbaijan.

=== Karabakh ===
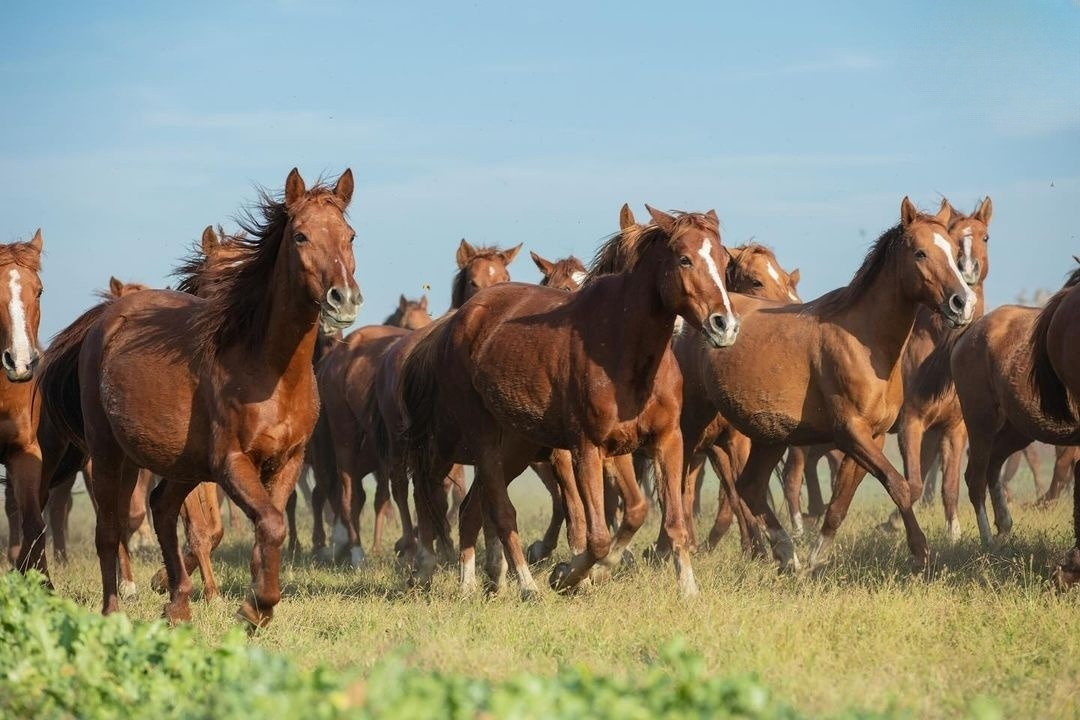
Karabakh horse

The symbol of fauna in Azerbaijan is the Karabakh horse which is a mountain-steppe racing and riding horse found only in Azerbaijan. The Karabakh horse is esteemed for its good temper, speed, elegance and intelligence. It is one of the oldest breeds, with ancestry dating to the ancient world. The horse was originally developed in the Karabakh region in the 5th century and is named after it.

== Caspian Sea ==
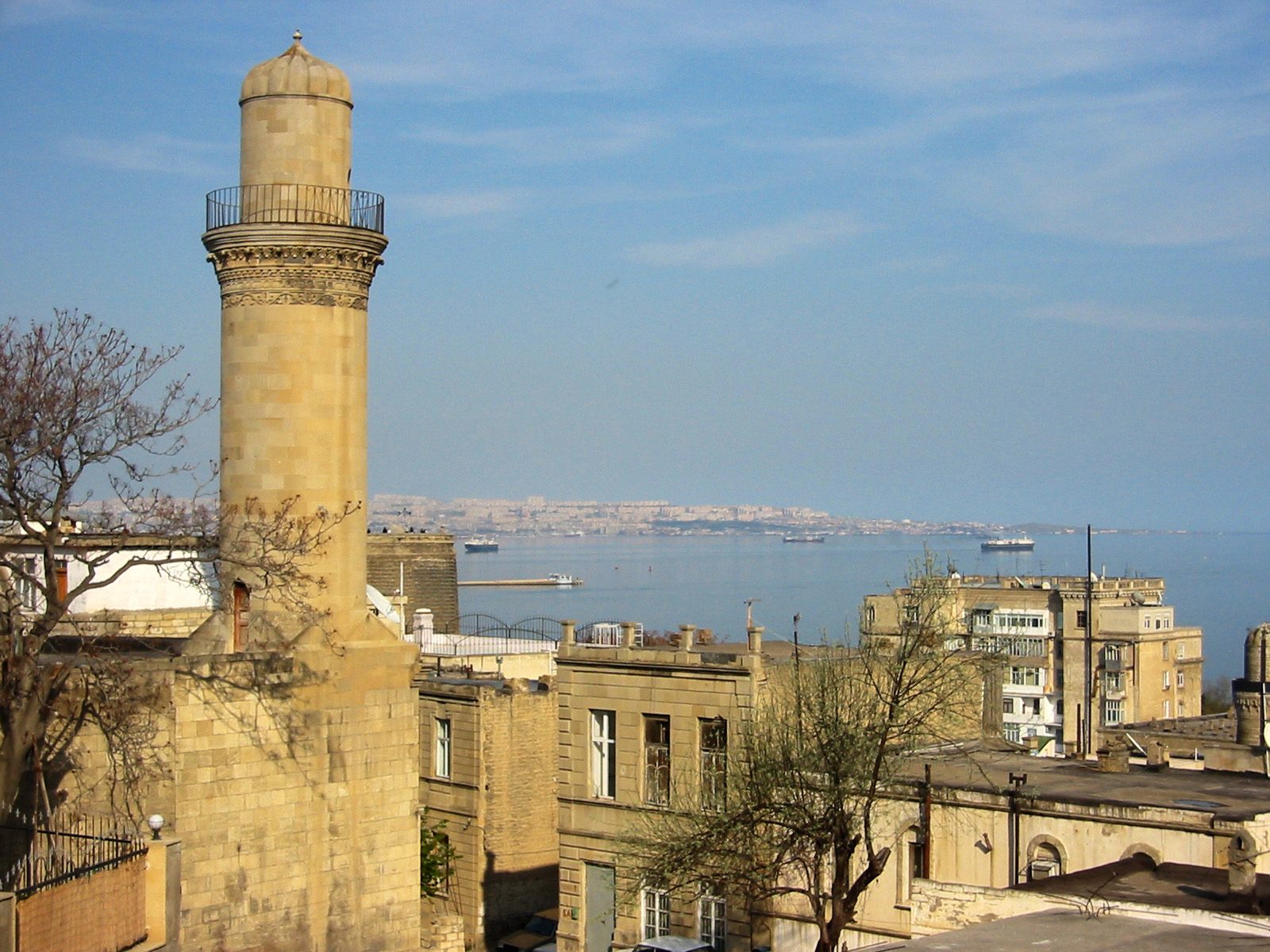
The Caspian Sea, viewed from Baku, Azerbaijan

The Caspian Sea is the largest lake on Earth by both area and volume, with a surface area of 371,000 square kilometres (143,244 mi^{2}) and a volume of 78,200 cubic kilometres (18,761 mi^{3}). It is a landlocked endorheic body of water and lies between Asia and Europe. It has a maximum depth of about 1,025 meters (3,363 feet). It is called a sea because when the Romans discovered it, they tasted the water and found it to be salty. It has a salinity of approximately 1.2 percent, about a third the salinity of seawater.

== Rivers and lakes ==
Rivers form the principal part of the water systems of Azerbaijan. There are 8,359 rivers of various lengths within Azerbaijan. Of them, 8,188 rivers are less than 25 kilometers in length. Only 24 rivers are over 100 kilometers long.

== Environmental issues ==
Like most republics of the Soviet Union, Azerbaijan experienced rapid development of all spheres of economics and human activity, which led to an all-round negative impact on the environment, including the inefficient usage of natural resources.

== See also ==
- History of Azerbaijan
