= Ilisu State Reserve =

Azerbaijan reserve

- Ilisu State Nature Reserve
- IUCN category Ia (strict nature reserve)
- Location within Azerbaijan
- Location: Qakh Rayon, Azerbaijan
- Nearest city: İlisu
- Coordinates: 41.483°N 46.984°E
- Area: 173.816 km^{2} (67.111 sq mi)
- Established: 1987
- Governing body: Ministry of Ecology and Natural Resources of Azerbaijan

Ilisu State Nature Reserve was established over a 93 km^{2} (36 sq mi) area in 1987 in Qakh Rayon, Azerbaijan. It aims to protect natural complexes of southern slopes of Major Caucasus, to preserve rare and endangered flora and fauna, to restore forests and prevent erosion of soil and flood. The reserve accounts for 500 plant species with nearly 60 species of endemic ones. One can come across such animals as roe deer, wild boar and chamois.

The territory of Ilisu State Reserve was expanded up to 173.816 km^{2} (67.111 sq mi) in March 2003.

== See also ==
- Nature of Azerbaijan
- National Parks of Azerbaijan
- State Reserves of Azerbaijan
- State Game Reserves of Azerbaijan
