= Basut-Chay State Reserve =

Protected area in Azerbaijan

Coordinates: 39°03′09″N 46°36′46″E

- IUCN category Ia (strict nature reserve)
- Area: 240 acres (97 ha)
- Established: 1974

Basut-Chay State Reserve or Besitchay State Reserve is a protected area of Azerbaijan, near the border with Armenia. It was established as a 107 hectare reserve in 1974 for preserving and protecting the rare Oriental plane tree. The area of the reserve was slightly reduced by 10 hectares in October 1980. The reserve covers the area around the Besitchay of the southeastern part of Minor Caucasus.

== History ==
Earlier, Oriental plane tree was widely distributed throughout the territory of the Azerbaijan Republic. At the same time, not excluding the south-eastern part of the level of the Lesser Caucasus. Today, plane trees can be found only in some parts of this country.

In the Basutchay basin, plane groves have been protected in the reserve mode for more than 25 years. Plane forests, which were located on the areas of Zangilan forestry, since February 1961 have become a conservation area. The Main Department of Forestry of the Council of Ministers of the Republic is responsible for its protection and restoration while creating forest cultures. But since such a grove protection system was unjustified, the Basutchay Reserve was created in 117 hectares in July 1974. Since October 1980, the reserve's area is 107 hectares of land, of which 100 hectares are forest, and in the rest of the territory the rock slides and the sands of the Basutchay floodplain extend.

== Geography ==
The reserve is located in Zangilan district. It is located 8 km from the town of Zangilan. The reserve was established in the valley of the Basutchay River, in the southeastern part of the Lesser Caucasus. It was created to protect the plane tree grove. Its territory is occupied mainly by the Basaltchay near-riverine sites and continues for about 15 km along the valley. It has a width of 150–200 m. It extends to the upper course of the Shikahogh River, which is located in the territory of the Armenian Republic, where it is also guarded. The reserve is located at an altitude of 630–800 m above sea level. It is located on the border zone in the west with the forests of the Armenian Republic.

=== Relief ===
Physico-geographical environment Basutchay Valley has an asymmetrical structure. So the right side of the valley is very steep, mountainous, and the left side is flatter, which is located on a hilly plate with an absolute height of 700–1000 m. Alluvial sediments cover the terraces of the valley. The tributaries of the Basutchay strongly dismembered the slopes of the valley.

=== Climate ===
The territory of the reserve is dominated by a moderately warm climate. Summer is hot and winter is mild.

The average annual temperature of the atmosphere is 13.3 °. The average temperature in winter is 1 °. The average summer temperature is 25.3 °.

Absolute maximum 41 °. The absolute minimum is –21 °.

The sum of temperatures above 10 ° per year reaches 4200 °.

For the period from November 23 to March 24, frosts fall.

Annual precipitation reaches more than 600 mm. Most of them are in spring and early summer. The minimum amount of precipitation falls in December (14 mm), and the maximum in May (90 mm). Most of the precipitation falls in the warm season. For a year it can be up to 25 days with a snow cover of 10–30 cm.

The level of annual evaporation is 900 mm (from 29 mm in January to 170 mm in July). relative humidity has an average of 66% (from 51% in July to 77% in November).

Despite the continental climate, the forest cover normally consists of various broad-leaved species. Eastern sycamore tree is quite a hardy tree species that suffers intense heat (45–50 °), frosts (—20, —25 °), drought (200 mm annual rainfall) and high moistening (1000 mm annual rainfall).

=== Soil ===
The earth cover of the reserve and its environs is covered with two types of soil: brown mountain forest and alluvial meadow-forest. Plane is unpretentious to the soil. It grows on any soils, even on a stony substrate, on alluvial sediments and strongly skeletal, infertile soils. Nevertheless, the plane tree forms more productive forests on powerful fertile irrigated soils.

== Flora and fauna ==
The main purpose of creating the reserve was to preserve the largest grove in the world, the eastern plane tree, which grows on 93.5% of the reserve's territory. The average age of local plane trees is 170 years. Individual giant trees, 50 meters in height and with a trunk diameter of up to 4 meters, are 1200–1500 years old. In addition to plane trees, here grows an oak, a Caucasian hornbeam, a juniper, a multiple fruit.

The rare guests of the reserve are wild boar, roe deer, wolf, jackal, badger and hare, entering the reserve from the neighboring forests. The nature of the reserve has much in common with the Shikahogh Reserve.

== Plane trees ==
The plane trees make up 93.5% of Basut-Chay State Reserve area. In average, plane trees live for 170 years. However, one can come across the plane trees 1200–1500 years of age, 50 meters in height and 4 meters in diameter.

== See also ==
- Nature of Azerbaijan
- National Parks of Azerbaijan
- State Reserves of Azerbaijan
- State Game Reserves of Azerbaijan
