= Tufan Lake =

Mountain in Azerbaijan

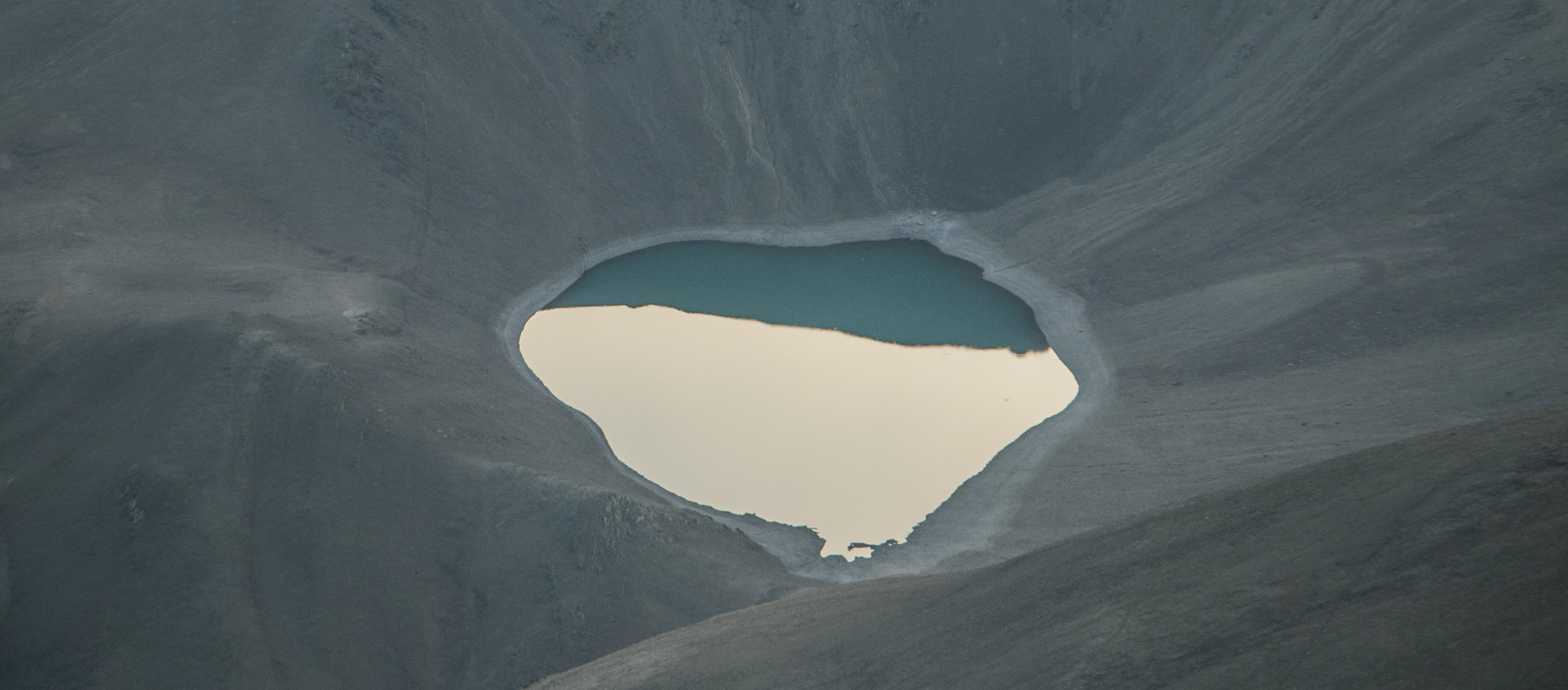
- Panoramic view of Tufan Lake from the east side in Autumn 2017

- Location within Azerbaijan
- Interactive map of Tufan Lake
- Coordinates: 41°09′59″N 47°57′50″E
- Catchment area: 102 km^{2} (39 sq mi)
- Basin countries: Azerbaijan
- Max. length: 0.16 km (0.099 mi)
- Surface area: 0.01 km (0.0062 mi)
- Max. depth: 5.6 m (18 ft)
- Water volume: 0.00011 km^{3} (0 cu mi)
- Surface elevation: 3,277 m (10,751 ft)

Tufan Lake (Azerbaijani: Tufangöl) is the highest mountain lake in Azerbaijan, located at an altitude of 3,277 m (10,751 ft) above sea level between the Kurvedağ and Tufandağ mountains in the eastern part of the Main Caucasian Range. It is located in the north of the Qabala District near the border with the Qusar District.
