= Ismailli State Reserve =

State reserve in Azerbaijan

Coordinates: 40°58′00″N 48°06′07″E

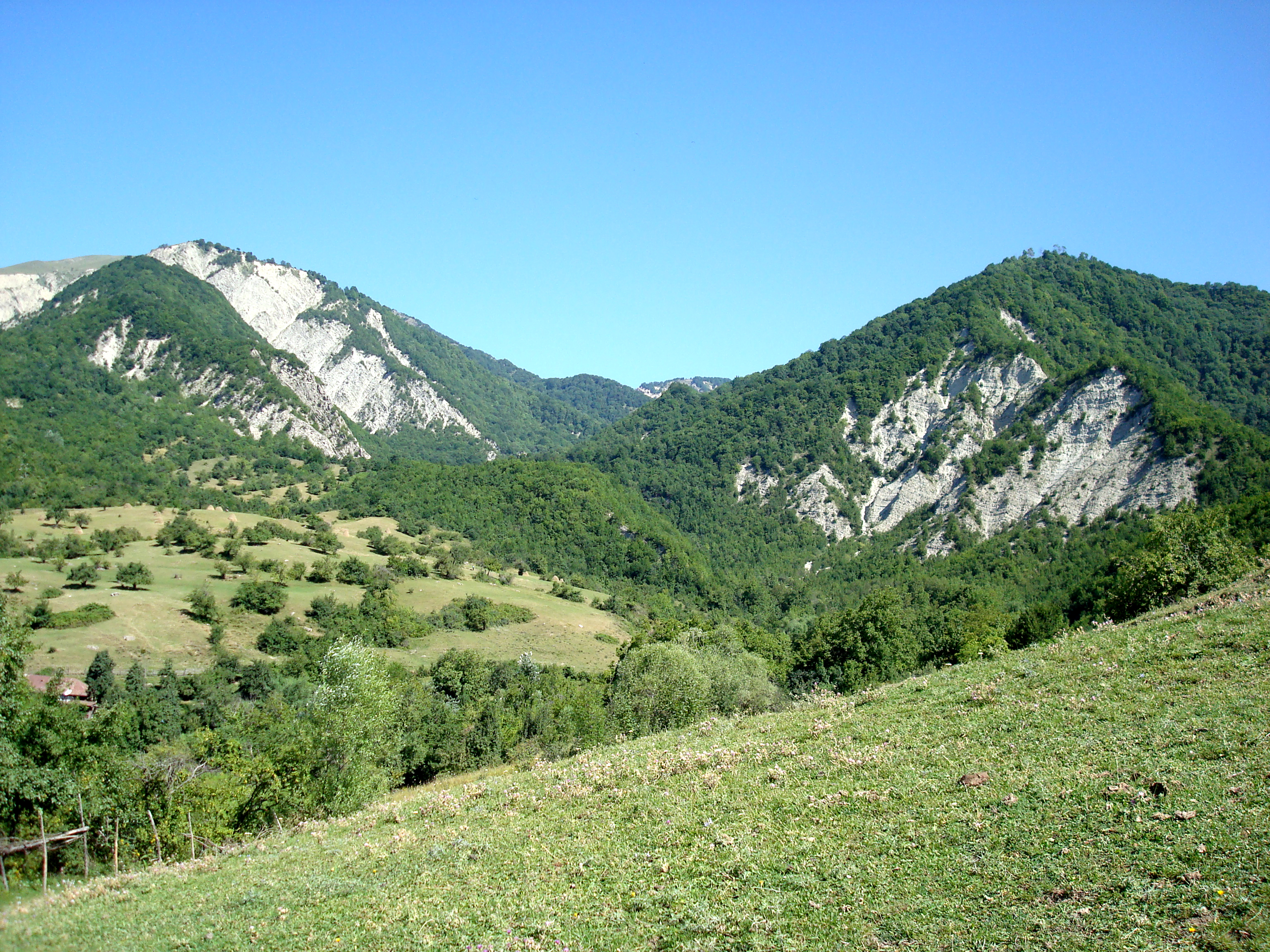
- The Ismailli State Reserve

- Location within Azerbaijan
- Location: Ismayilli District and Qabala District, Azerbaijan
- Nearest city: Qabala
- Area: 57.78 km^{2} (22.31 sq mi)
- Established: 1981

Ismailli State Reserve or Ismayilly State Reserve was established in Azerbaijan on an area of 57.78 square kilometres (22.31 sq mi) in 1981 for the preservation and protection of natural complexes, occupying the north part of the southern slope of Major Caucasus.

The area of the reserve was expanded by 109.60 square kilometres (42.32 sq mi) to 167 square kilometres (64 sq mi) in June 2003.

A digital management system has been set up as of 2019.

The forests are mainly formed of beeches, hornbeams and oaks, with small numbers of birch trees, cud, lime-trees, etc. Among them are chestnut-leaved oak and horehound oak that are included in the Red Book of Azerbaijan. The reserve accounts for nearly 170 animal species. 104 bird species of 13 orders are found in the reserve. Such mammals as a Brown bear, wild cat, lynx, Caucasian dear, Roe deer, Chamois and Caucasian goat populate the reserve.

== See also ==
- Nature of Azerbaijan
- National Parks of Azerbaijan
- State Reserves of Azerbaijan
- State Game Reserves of Azerbaijan
