= Təngəaltı =

- Municipality
- Location within Azerbaijan
- Coordinates: 41°12′26″N 48°37′33″E
- Country: Azerbaijan
- Rayon: Quba
- Elevation: 702 m (2,303 ft)

Population
  - Total: 607
- Time zone: UTC+4 (AZT)
  - Summer (DST): UTC+5 (AZT)

Təngəaltı (also, Təngəalti and Tengyaalty) is a village and municipality in the Quba Rayon of Azerbaijan. It has a population of 607.
