= Shahbuz State Reserve =

Protected area in Azerbaijan

Shahbuz State Reserve is a natural park and seismic station in Azerbaijan. It was created on the area of 31.39 km^{2} of Shahbuz District of Nakhchivan Autonomous Republic of Azerbaijan on June 16, 2003. The area of Batabat Lake is mainly surrounded by grassland. Medicinal herbs, oak trees etc. dominate the flora of the area. The most widely spread animals are partridge, broad-tailed nightingale, among mammals-brown bear, badger, lynx, etc.

It was established in June 2003 for protecting rare and endangered plant and animal species.

== See also ==
- Nature of Azerbaijan
- National Parks of Azerbaijan
- State Reserves of Azerbaijan
- State Game Reserves of Azerbaijan
