= Protected areas of Azerbaijan =

Protected areas of Azerbaijan include:

- State reserves of Azerbaijan (11)
- National Parks of Azerbaijan (8)
- State Game Reserves of Azerbaijan (24)

Azerbaijan has 9 climate zones and 4,500 higher plant species, 240 of them are endemics and "relicts", as well as 140 rare and endangered species. Fauna include 107 mammals, 394 birds, 54 reptiles, 9 amphibians, 14,000 insects and approximately 108 fish species.

The first nature reservesin Azerbaijan were established in the 1930s in Goygol, Zagatala, and Gizilaghaj. The Law on the Protection of the Nature of Azerbaijan was passed in 1969. Seven other specially protected State Nature Reserve sites were added: Shirvan, Basitchay, Garayazi, Aggol, Ismayilli, Ilisu, and Altiaghaj. Total protected areas amount to 10.3% of Azerbaijan's land mass.

There are also

- biosphere reserves (part of state reserves)
- natural parks
- ecological parks
- natural monuments
- zoological parks
- botanical and dendrological parks
- sanatoria
- resorts.

== See also ==
- Nature of Azerbaijan
- Climate of Azerbaijan
- Ministry of Ecology and Natural Resources of Azerbaijan Republic
