= Eldar Pine State Reserve =

Protected wilderness area in Azerbaijan

Eldar Pine State Reserve is a state reserve in Azerbaijan. It was established on the area of 16.86 km^{2} of Samuh administrative region on December 16, 2004.

In 1967 the reserve (with the area of 3.92 km^{2}) was transformed into a branch of Goy-Gol State Reserve.

At present this reserve covers 16.86 km^{2} area and complex has been founded in the reserve.

== Eldar Pine ==
The reserve is mainly designed for preserving and protecting Eldar Pine, a rare and endemic species of trees.

== Expansion ==
On December 28, 2006, the Azerbaijani Minister of Ecology and Natural Resources Minister; Huseyn Bagirov announced the expansion of the Eldar Pine State Reserve. The minister said a project concerning the enlargement of the territory had been launched. The main goal of the project is to protect one of the rare trees of the nature, the Eldar Pine tree, which can only be found in the region.

== See also ==
- Nature of Azerbaijan
- National Parks of Azerbaijan
- State Reserves of Azerbaijan
- State Game Reserves of Azerbaijan
