= Gara-Yaz State Reserve =

State reserve in Azerbaijan

Coordinates: 41°19′18″N 45°09′34″E

Gara-Yaz State Reserve or Qarayazy State Reserve was established over an area spanning 48.55 km^{2} in 1978 for protecting and restoring riparian woodlands around the Kur. It mainly protects rare and endangered Tugay ecological systems, occupying the lands in the mid stream of the Kur. Riparian woodlands includes such types of trees as white poplar, oak, alder-tree and white acacia. Among sharp-clawed animals the most widely spread are wild boar and deer, among birds; pheasant, thrush, dove, etc.

The area of Gara-Yaz State Reserve was expanded by 48.03 km^{2} to 96.58 km^{2} on June 2, 2003.

== See also ==
- Nature of Azerbaijan
- National Parks of Azerbaijan
- State Reserves of Azerbaijan
- State Game Reserves of Azerbaijan
