= Red Book of Azerbaijan =

Inventory of the Azerbaijani conservation status of biological species

The Red Book of Azerbaijan (Azerbaijani: Azərbaycan Qırmızı Kitabı) is an official state document on the status of rare and endangered species of wild animals and plants in Azerbaijan. It contains information about the state, distribution and protection measures of animal and plant species within the Republic, including the Azerbaijani section of the Caspian Sea.

== Description ==
According to the legislation, the Red Book is planned to be published every 10 years. The first edition, published in 1989, listed 108 animal and 140 plant species.

Species are placed in one of 2 categories: endangered or rare. Endangered species are those that have sustained a substantial decrease in population and range and have reached a crisis level. Species with populations that are trending downward and are found in localized areas are considered rare. Animals and plants that are little studied, the necessary information about whose number and resources in nature is lacking, or there are particular difficulties in the organization of their protection are also considered rare species.

== Second edition ==
Although the legislation states a new edition should be published every ten years, the second edition of the book was delayed by 24 years. It was finally published in 2013. Under the leadership of academic Jalal Aliyev, the second edition reflects the study of rare and endangered species of plants, fungi, and fauna distributed within Azerbaijan. This edition published information on 300 higher and primitive plants, as well as fungi and 223 fauna species, their distribution, number and population trends.

The second edition of the Red Book provides information about the species of flora and fauna of the Republic that need protection. Of the 300 species included in the list, 266 belong to higher plants, 20 belong to primitive plants (6 algae, 13 sedges and 1 moss) and 14 to fungi. Among higher plants, there are six species of pteridophytes, four species of gymnosperms, and 256 species of angiosperms.

== See also ==
- List of Red Lists
