= Flora of Azerbaijan =

Collective plants of Azerbaijan

Example species

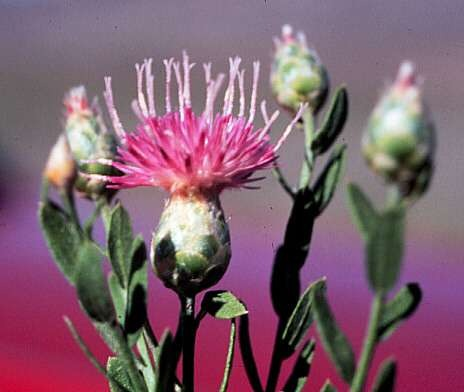
Acroptilon repens

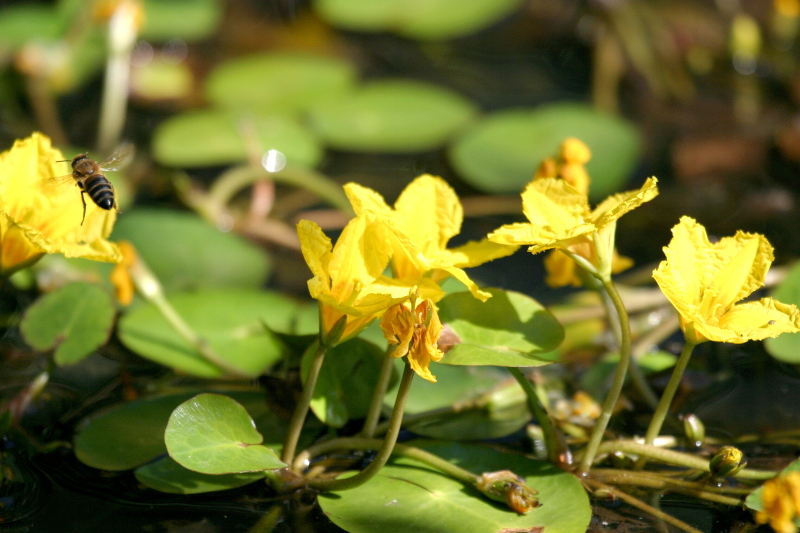
Nymphoides peltata

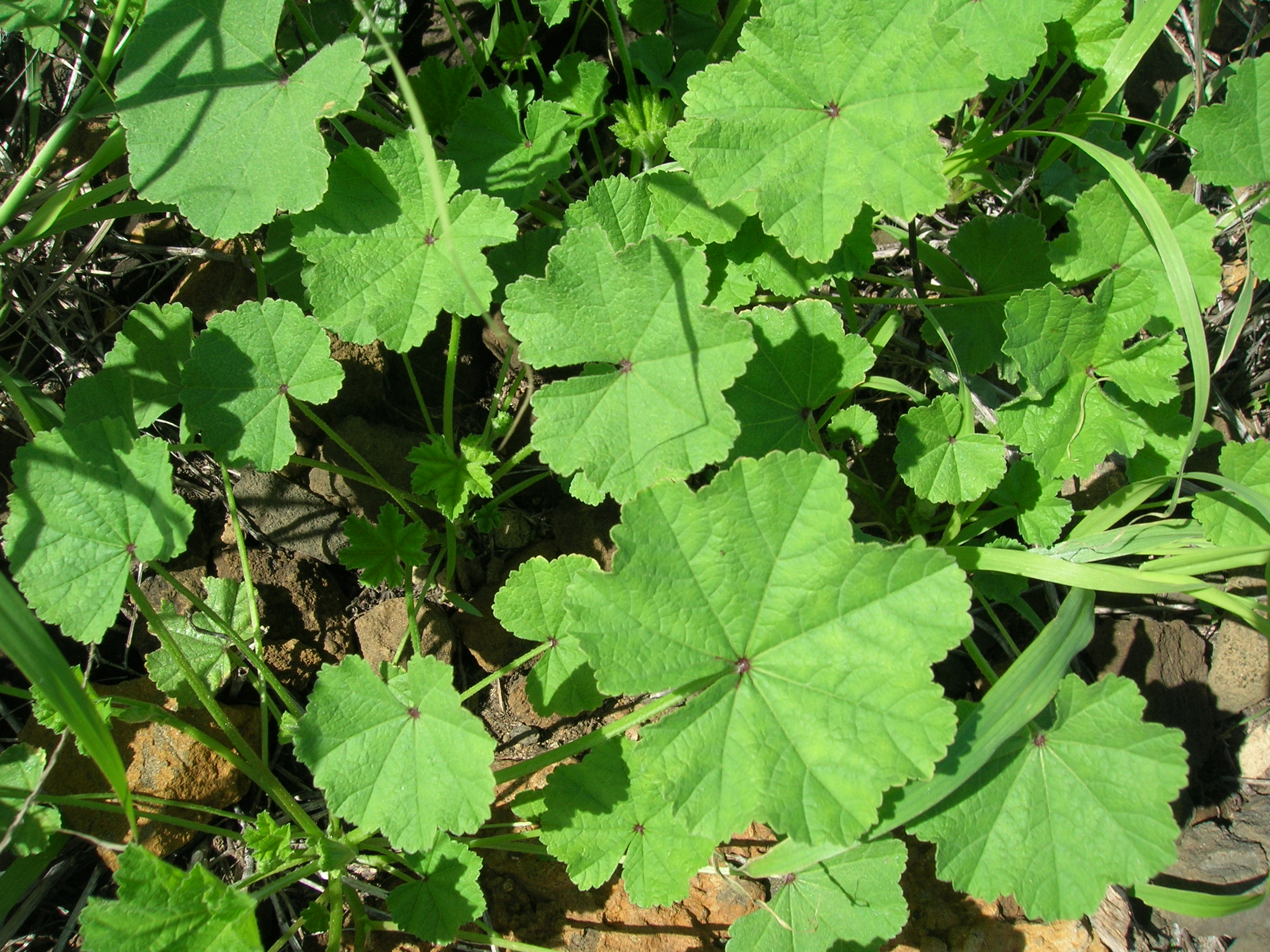
Malva parviflora

Flora of Azerbaijan or Vegetation of Azerbaijan refers to the plants, trees and flowers which can be found in Azerbaijan.

Azerbaijan has a very rich flora, more than 4,500 species of higher plants have been registered in the country. Due to the unique climate in Azerbaijan, the flora is much richer in the number of species than the flora of the other republics of the South Caucasus. About 66% of the species growing in the whole Caucasus can be found in Azerbaijan.

The richness of Azerbaijan's flora and the variety of its vegetation results from the variety and richness of its physical-geographic and natural-historic conditions and from its compound history influenced by the remote floristic regions.

== The floristic areas of Azerbaijan ==
All types of floristic areas – ancient wood, boreal, plain, xerophytic, desert, Caucasian and accidental – exist in Azerbaijan. The representatives of ancient wood type are widely spread in the Talysh region and the location which is suitable for boreal type is the high mountains of Great and Minor Caucasus. The plain, Caucasian, xerophytic and desert types belong to foothills and the lowlands, especially Kur-Araz Lowland.

In Azerbaijan forest cover is around 14.% of the total land area, equivalent to 1,131,770 hectares (ha) of forest in 2020, up from 944,740 hectares (ha) in 1990. In 2020, naturally regenerating forest covered 826,200 hectares (ha) and planted forest covered 305,570 hectares (ha). Of the naturally regenerating forest 0% was reported to be primary forest (consisting of native tree species with no clearly visible indications of human activity) and around 33% of the forest area was found within protected areas. For the year 2015, 100% of the forest area was reported to be under public ownership, 0% private ownership and 0% with ownership listed as other or unknown.

== Hyrcanian Forest ==
In the forests of Azerbaijan various relict trees may be observed. One of these forests is Hyrcanian (Hirkan), which is in the south of Azerbaijan. These relict trees' decorative leaves, strong trunks, large crowns have attracted many naturalists, botanists from all over the world. The climate of Hyrcanian forests of Talysh mountains is humid and warm. This area is the most biodiversified area of Elburz Mountains compared to the other neighboring areas, with the 95 tree species, 110 shrubs, and more than 1,000 other higher plant species.

=== The well-known relict trees of Hyrcanian Forests ===
The relict trees hold a socio-economic importance and even cultural significance.

- Cappadocian Maple (Acer cappadocicum)
- Velvet Maple (Acer velutinum)
- Persian Silk Tree (Albizia julibrissin)
- Caucasian Alder (Alnus subcordata)
- Caucasian Persimmon (Diospyros lotus)
- Caspian Locust (Gleditsia caspica)
- Persian Ironwood (Parrotia persica)
- Caucasian Wingnut (Pterocarya fraxinifolia)
- Chestnut-leaved Oak (Quercus castaneifolia)
- Caucasian Zelkova (Zelkova carpinifolia)

=== The vegetation in arid regions ===
In the Nakhchivan Autonomous Republic, Jabrayil, Zanghelan, Steppe Plateau, Zuvand regions of republic which have arid climate, a specific mountainous xerophytic vegetation is developed. The species of thyme (Thymus) are very typical of those arid regions. The following species are specific there: Lactuca, Berberis, Zygophyllum atriplicoides, Astragalus szovitsii, Salvia dracocephaloides, Pyrethrum, Marrubium, Achillea, Phlomis, etc.

In Eldar Oyugu which is located in the northwest of Azerbaijan has also arid climate and there is an isolated spot of typical thin forest formed by Pinus eldarica, which is an endemic relict of the tertiary period. This forest has such higher plant species as juniper, pistachio, Paliurus spina-christi and 30-35 others. These species obviously belong to the mountainous xerophytic type.

=== Tugai Forests ===
Tugai forests lie through the major rivers Kura, Araz, Ganikh, Gabirri. The southern willows, mulberry trees, elms, pomegranates, hybrid-type poplars, Elaeagnus, Tamarix, etc. grow in these forests. Sometimes the shrubs can form a mixed forest along the sides of mountainous rivers or in river valleys, e. g. Hippophae rhamnoides, Elaeagnus, willows (Salix), Rhus coriaria, Tamarix, mulberries, pomegranates, wild roses, blackberries, etc. Hippophae rhamnoides is spread in the valleys of the Shin, Kish, Damiraparan, Turyan, Geychay, Agsu, Velvele and Terter rivers. Along the rivers of Talysh Pterocarya pterocarpa and Alnus subcordata can be observed. Another species of alder, Alnus barbata, is typical in Talysh. Local endemic species of fig (Ficus hyrcanica), Humulus lupulus, Smilax excelsa, Sambucus ebulus, Carex of many species, Cardamine, Poa, etc. are typical for the coastal forests of Talysh.

=== Pine trees ===
Two species of pine trees are spread in Azerbaijan: Pinus eldarica and Pinus Kochiana. The first one grows on the Steppe Plateau at 600 m above sea level, the second one grows in at 1,600 m above sea level in the region of Gyok-Gyol and in the Bulanig river valley of the Belokan region.

=== Species in places which are above sea level ===
At 1,800-3,200 m above sea level alpine and sub-alpine meadows, meadow steppes are observed. Mainly high grasses like Heracleum, Achillea, Cephalaria gigantea, Filipendula ulmaria, Calamagrostis arundinacea, Brachypodium silvaticum, Agrostis capillaris, Poa nemoralis, Koeleria gracilis, Vicia, Melilotus, clover (Trifolium), Verbascum, Aconitum, Delphinium, Dactylis glomerata, and various species of the Rose family are specific species for that places. Sub-alpine meadows' formation depends on relief and macro climatic peculiarities. The sub-alpine belt consists of mesophytic meadows and drier meadow-steppes which includes various species of cereals and clover, Geranium, Inula, Cephalaria, Scabiosa, Galium, Tragopogon, Betonica, Primula, Plantago, Rumex, Urtica, Cirsium, etc. According to the investigations there are about 1,000 species are spread in sub-alpine meadows.

=== The plants with healing effects ===
In the Middle Age Azerbaijan medicine 365 plant species were used for treatment, whereas in modern Azerbaijan medicine only 230 of them are in use and the other 135 species are considered as lost medicinal plants for new generations.

Medical Plants	Medically important parts of the plants	The diseases which are healed
Berberis vulgaris	Leaves, root, grass and fruits	Rickets, anaemia, tonsillitis, malaria, arthralgia, icterus, gastrointestinal diseases, antitussive
Crataegus pentagyna	Fruits and flowers	Has a chronotropic and positive inotropic effect on heart muscle, improves heart and brain circulation, used in the treatment of arrhythmia, tachycardia and hypertension
Althaea officinalis	Root	Respiratory tract infections, gastric ulcer, diarrhoea, acute gastritis, cystitis, quinsy
Hippophae rhamnoides	Fruits	Trophic sores, moniliasis, respiratory tract infections, skin tuberculosis, cancer
Vaccinium vitis idaea	Leave and ripen fruits	Liver diseases, gastritis with low acidity, rheumatoid arthritis, nocturnal enuresis, diarrhoea, antihelminthic
Vaccinium myrtillis	Leave and berries	Nocturnal enuresis, arthralgia, gastritis, chronic tonsillitis, moniliasis, deformation of joints, dysentery, enterocolitis, acute and chronic gastroenteritis
Inula helenium	Root and rhizome	Gastrointestinal diseases, gastric and small bowel diseases, common cold, bronchitis, antihelminthic, antitussive

== Natural Reserves ==
These natural reserves are preserving the rare (sometimes endemic) tree species and therefore have a great role in preserving the natural fauna. Forests occupy 32% of Azerbaijan and all of them are well preserved.

=== Altiaghac reserve ===
Altiaghac reserve is located in the northeast of Azerbaijan. It is one of the biggest reserves in Azerbaijan and is 11,305 hectares. It is covered with deciduous forests, where the main types of trees are Caucasian oak, Caucasian hornbeam, oriental beech, ash and birch and commonly you can meet are most common thorny hawthorn, wild rose and blackberry bushes.

=== Pirgulin reserve ===
Pirgulin reserve was created in 1968, the total area of which is 1500 hectares. The reserve has white maple, iron tree, loquat, cherry, walnut, ash, pear, apple, yew, and white maple.

=== Goygol ===
Goygol reserve was created in 2008. It's located on the slope of Kapaz mountain, at 1000–3600 meters above the sea.

Th reserve was created to preserve a rich vegetative cover (over 80 types of trees and bushes) and bio media.

=== Zagatala reserve ===
The Zagatala reserve was created in 1929 and is located in the north-west of Azerbaijan. It has over 900 types of vegetation (plants).

=== Girkan reserve ===
The Girkan reserve was created in 2004 and is 42 797 hectares. From vegetation, there are over 1900 flora species. This includes 162 endemic, 95 rare, and 38 endangered species. Among those, some of the species are listed in the Red book, for example, Girkan boxwood, ironwood, chestnut-leaf oak, figs, Girkan pear, Lankaran albition, Caucasian persimmon, alder and others.

== See also ==
Fauna of Azerbaijan

Azerbaijan
