= Pirgulu State Reserve =

Protected area in Azerbaijan

- Pirgulu State Nature Reserve
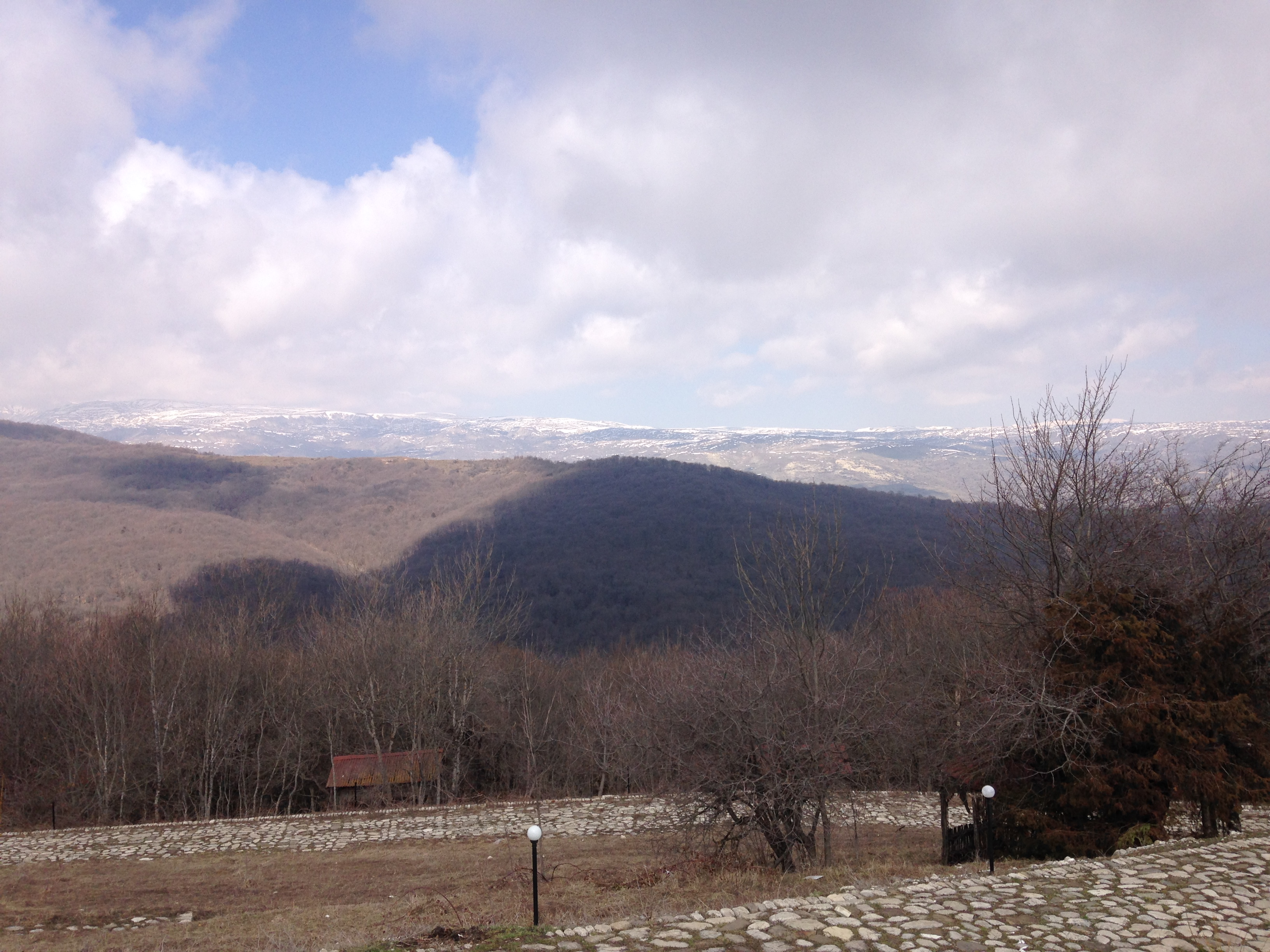
- Greater Caucasus Mountains viewed from Pirgulu State Reserve

- Location within Azerbaijan
- Location: Shamakhi District, Azerbaijan
- Nearest city: Shamakhi, Azerbaijan
- Coordinates: 40°45′44″N 48°34′25″E
- Area: 3,758 acres (15.21 km^{2})
- Established: 1968

Pirgulu State Reserve was established in Azerbaijan on December 25, 1968, over an area of 15.21 km^{2} (6 sq mi) in 1968 in the Shamakhi District, south-east of the Large Caucasus. The reserve was established to protect mountain forests, various flora, and prevent air pollution. Deep canyons are found in the reserve, with depths of up to 600-metre (2,000 ft). The fauna found in the reserve includes over 60 species, including brown bear, wolf, forest cat, lynx, weasel, wild boar, and roe deer.

The area of Pirgulu State Reserve was expanded by 27.53 km^{2} (11 sq mi) and reached 42.74 km^{2} (17 sq mi) in 2003.
