= Tourism in Azerbaijan =

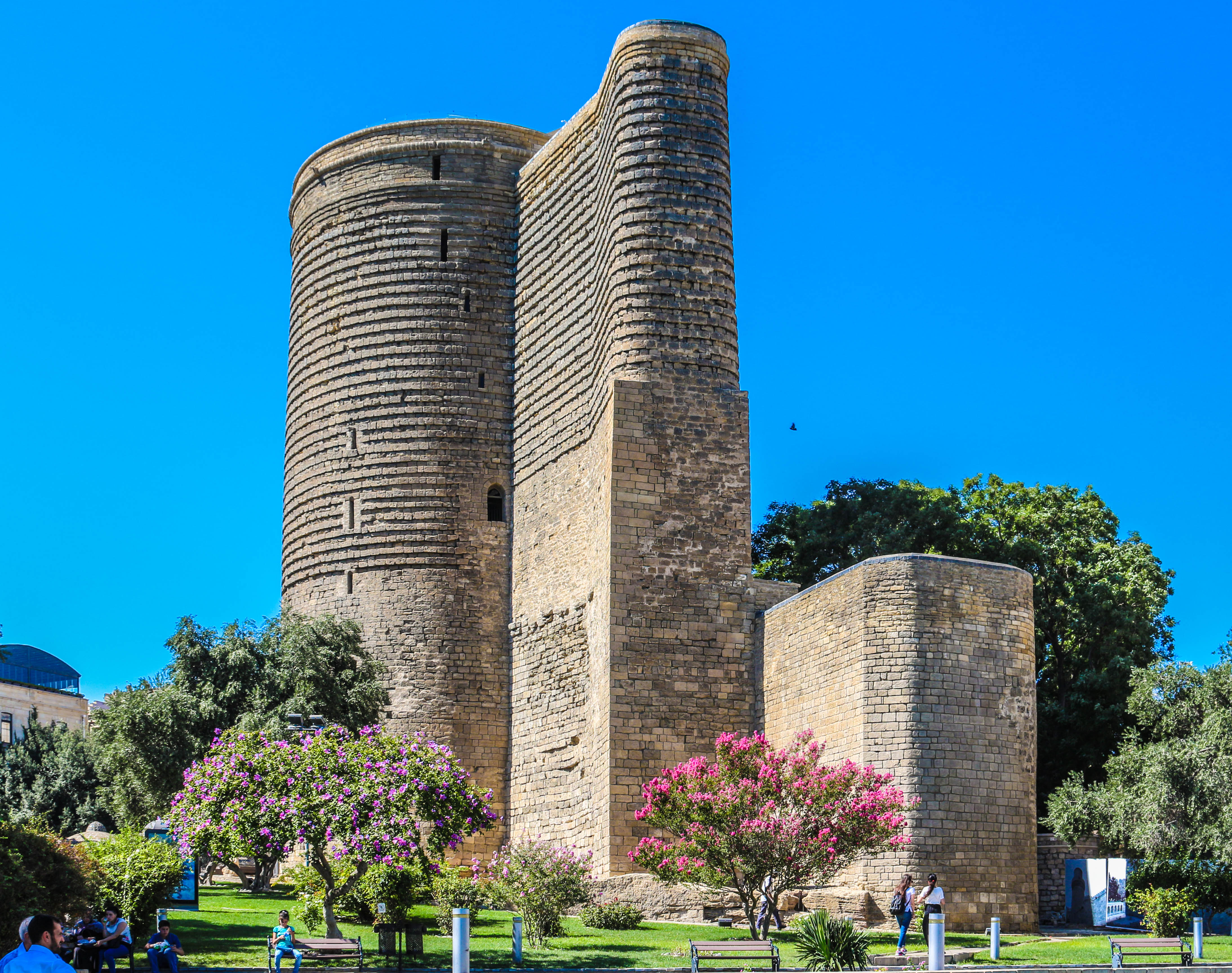
Maiden Tower, Baku, is one of Azerbaijan's most iconic monuments

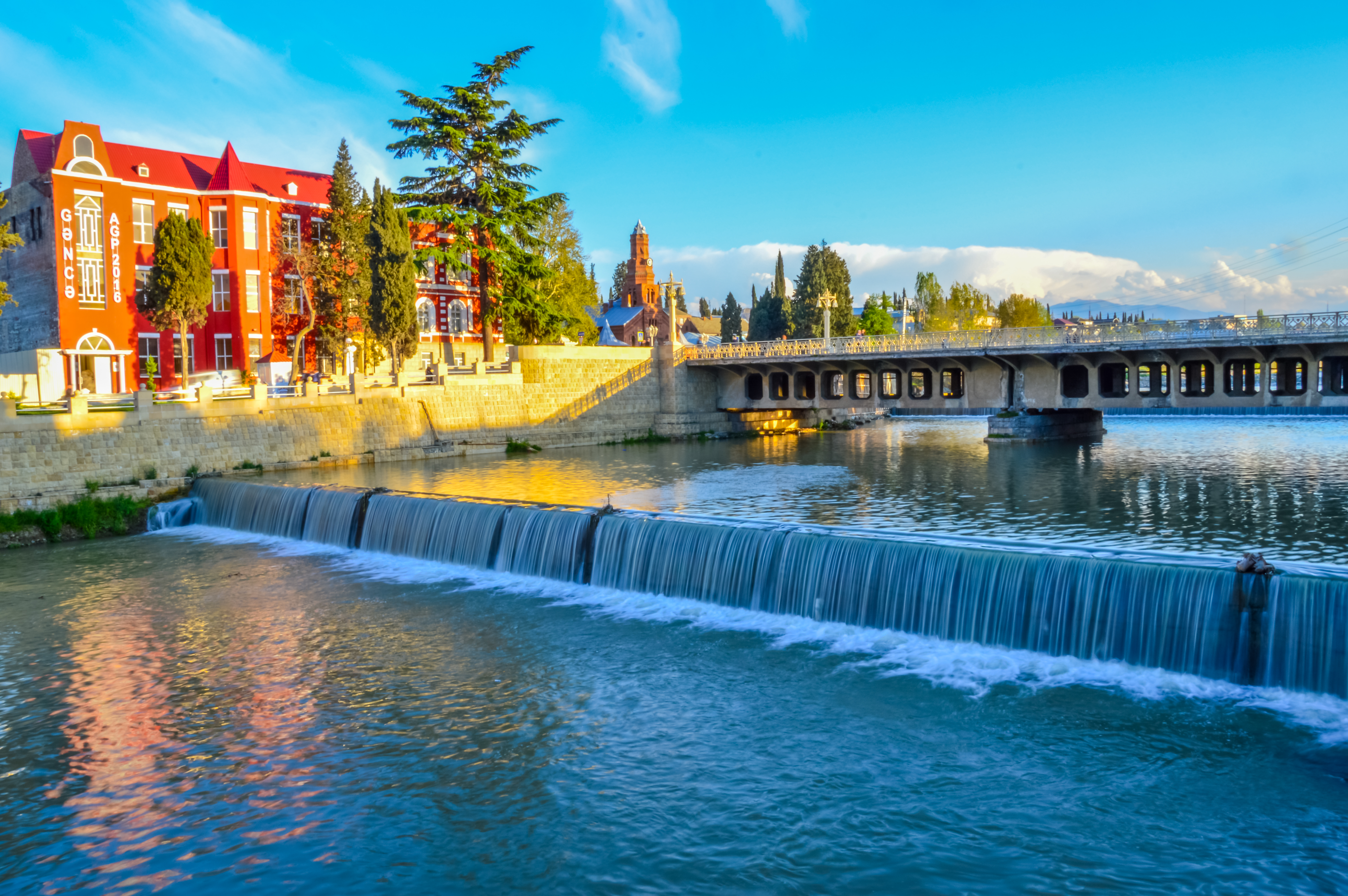
Ganja, the center of the Arran School of Architecture, is also the country's second largest city.

Tourism in Azerbaijan has been an important sector of the Azerbaijani economy since the 1990s. According to Azerbaijan's Center for Economic and Social Development, the country is in 39th place among 148 countries in tourism competitiveness indicators. The World Travel and Tourism Council reported that Azerbaijan is among the top ten countries with the greatest increase in visitor exports from 2010 to 2016. The country had the world's fastest-developing travel and tourism economy (a 46.1% increase) in 2017. To promote tourism, Azerbaijan sponsored Atlético Madrid jerseys reading "Azerbaijan – Land of Fire". In 2018, a new tourism brand and a slogan "take another look" were introduced.

In 2025, tourism services brought Azerbaijan about $2 billion in foreign exchange earnings. The value added of tourism-related activities approached 7 billion manats, and the sector's share in the national economy reached approximately 5.4%.

== Visas ==
Tourist visas can be obtained from an Azerbaijani embassy or electronically online without an embassy visit. In 2016, a tax-free shopping system was introduced to attract foreign shoppers. Purchases must be made up to 90 days before export to be eligible for the tax refund.

In January 2017, Azerbaijan introduced its electronic visa for a single-entry visit of up to 30 days. The e-visa is available to tourists from 93 countries, who can apply on the e-visa website. A visa is not required for citizens of the Commonwealth of Independent States (except Turkmenistan and Armenia) who intend to visit Azerbaijan within 90 days.

Due to a state of war with Armenia, the government of Azerbaijan has banned the entry of citizens from Armenia, as well as citizens of any other country who are of Armenian descent (including Armenian Russians, Turkish Armenians, etc.), to the Republic of Azerbaijan.

== Statistics ==
Tourist arrivals of 2024 in %

Yearly tourist arrivals in millions

Over 1.4 million tourists visited Azerbaijan in 2008. In 2017, a record-high number of 2,691,998 foreign citizens visited Azerbaijan. Visitors to the country in 2017 came from the following countries:

In 2024, Azerbaijan received about 2.63 million foreign visitors, a 25.9% increase on 2023, of whom roughly 1.86 million arrived for tourism purposes, according to the State Statistical Committee.

2017 visitors
Country	Number
Russia	853,082
(Georgia (country)) Georgia	537,710
Iran	362,597
Turkey	301,553
United Arab Emirates	102,360
Iraq	62,454
Ukraine	57,756
Saudi Arabia	33,273
Kazakhstan	31,994
United Kingdom	29,514
Uzbekistan	16,093
Germany	13,042
Belarus	12,320
United States	12,291
Israel	10,814
Italy	8,654
Turkmenistan	7,637
Saudi Arabia	7,463
China	7,363
India	6,012
France	5,785
Total	2,691,998

Visitors by year
Year	Number
2006	900,000
2007	1,100,000
2008	1,400,000
2009 (9 months)	1,000,988
2010	1,850,000
2011	2,239,000
2012	2,484,048
2013	2,508,904
2014	2,297,804
2015	2,006,176
2016	2,242,783
2017	2,691,998
2018	2,849,600
2019	3,170,000
2020	1,299,400
2021	792,000
2022	1,602,000
2023	2,086,000
2024	2,626,700
2025	2,570,000

Tourists in Azerbaijan by nationality (2010–2019)
Rank	Nationality	2010	2011	2012	2013	2014	2015	2016	2017	2018	2019
1	Russia	701,110	786,684	876,013	903,242	843,851	685,555	744,125	854,331	880,029	932,984
2	Georgia	491,942	573,063	763,251	810,390	699,532	571,648	506,306	538,213	610,556	725,465
3	Turkey	214,594	242,606	295,549	361,413	314,476	288,620	313,341	301,924	291,499	316,628
4	Saudi Arabia	312	284	380	479	507	727	7,463	33,312	73,284	107,230
5	United Arab Emirates	412	469	551	638	821	2,379	53,180	102,498	94,031	68,346
6	India	3,755	3,715	5,048	4,791	4,853	5,584	6,012	14,244	39,051	65,118
7	Ukraine	31,500	40,030	42,393	51,802	58,201	55,119	55,508	57,818	57,707	59,116
8	Turkmenistan	4,072	3,969	4,906	4,766	5,398	6,800	7,637	17,101	28,305	52,127
9	Iraq	549	679	917	991	738	2,147	62,983	62,547	67,514	50,723
10	Kazakhstan	19,209	28,225	25,295	28,226	29,468	27,145	31,994	36,360	37,824	47,551
11	Israel	6,346	5,671	6,369	6,989	7,534	8,325	10,814	15,385	40,185	47,056
12	Pakistan	1,949	1,743	1,675	1,767	1,817	2,193	3,998	17,579	41,307	46,602
13	United Kingdom	24,160	24,646	29,125	32,841	33,563	34,892	29,514	31,751	29,417	36,914
14	Kuwait	322	324	233	392	419	528	1,699	16,481	29,803	30,303
15	China	5,846	6,224	5,060	6,465	5,930	5,094	7,363	10,274	15,730	25,542
	Others	959,375	1,012,692	1,120,726	980,164	974,674	1,277,506	1,409,215	1,643,517	1,484,033	558,668
	Total	1,962,906	2,239,141	2,484,048	2,508,904	2,297,804	2,006,176	2,248,773	2,696,745	2,849,592	3,170,373

Tourists in Azerbaijan by nationality (2020–2023)
Rank	Nationality	2023	2022	2021	2020
1	Russia	624,753	446,712	258,315	225,201
2	Turkey	378,045	311,804	197,907	160,504
3	Iran	165,214	170,450	125,358	72,783
4	India	117,302	60,731	5,705	12,769
5	Georgia	104,450	82,206	62,666	184,228
6	Saudi Arabia	80,675	96,233	8,834	11,945
7	Qatar	58,062	3,411	1,912	1,567
8	Pakistan	55,148	51,691	2,948	7,773
9	Kuwait	29,692	22,609	2,289	7,076
10	Israel	29,091	23,933	6,655	4,238
11	United Arab Emirates	45,759	41,085	17,320	7,951
12	Uzbekistan	39,655	26,301	4,213	5,283
13	Ukraine	31,267	27,741	17,428	16,953
14	Belarus	27,612	18,562	5,730	6,036
15	Turkmenistan	26,010	11,188	2,738	8,257
	Others	283,745	285,592	348,513	272,148
	Total	2,085,790	1,602,279	791,751	795,722

Most of the visitors were from Europe, Asia, and North America. There were 1,818,258 foreigners in Azerbaijan in 2017. The overwhelming majority were citizens of the Russian Federation, Georgia, Iran, Turkey and UAE. “Azerbaijan expects a massive flow of tourists from the Arab countries, Iran, Russia, Kazakhstan, much less will come from Ukraine and Belarus, and only a small flow from European states.

Azerbaijan had 320 hotels in 2007, 370 in 2008, 452 in 2009, 499 in 2010, 508 in 2011 and 514 in 2012. The country has 230 tourist agencies and 560 hotels and hostels.

== State support ==
Azerbaijan began tourism-development planning for 2002–2005 and 2010–2014. The programs compiled tourism statistics, particularly its effect on the GNP. The Ministry of Tourism made a development study from 2008 to 2016 to increase accommodations and attract foreigners.

In March 2018, Ministry of Culture tourism head Aydin Ismiyev expressed a desire to develop Halal tourism. The following month, the 17th international tourism and travel exhibition (AITF 2018) opened. Azerbaijan also provides culinary tourism.

== Resort areas ==
In addition to the capital, Baku, Azerbaijan has a number of resort areas with varied climates and a variety of flora and fauna. Notable areas are the cities of Ganja, Nakhchivan, Gabala and Shaki Shaki is noted for its architectural heritage: the 1763 Palace of Shaki Khans, mausoleums and fortresses. Nakhchivan was a centre of traditional medicine and has salt mines and mausoleums. Lankaran, near the Caspian Sea, has a history dating back to the 10th century BC.

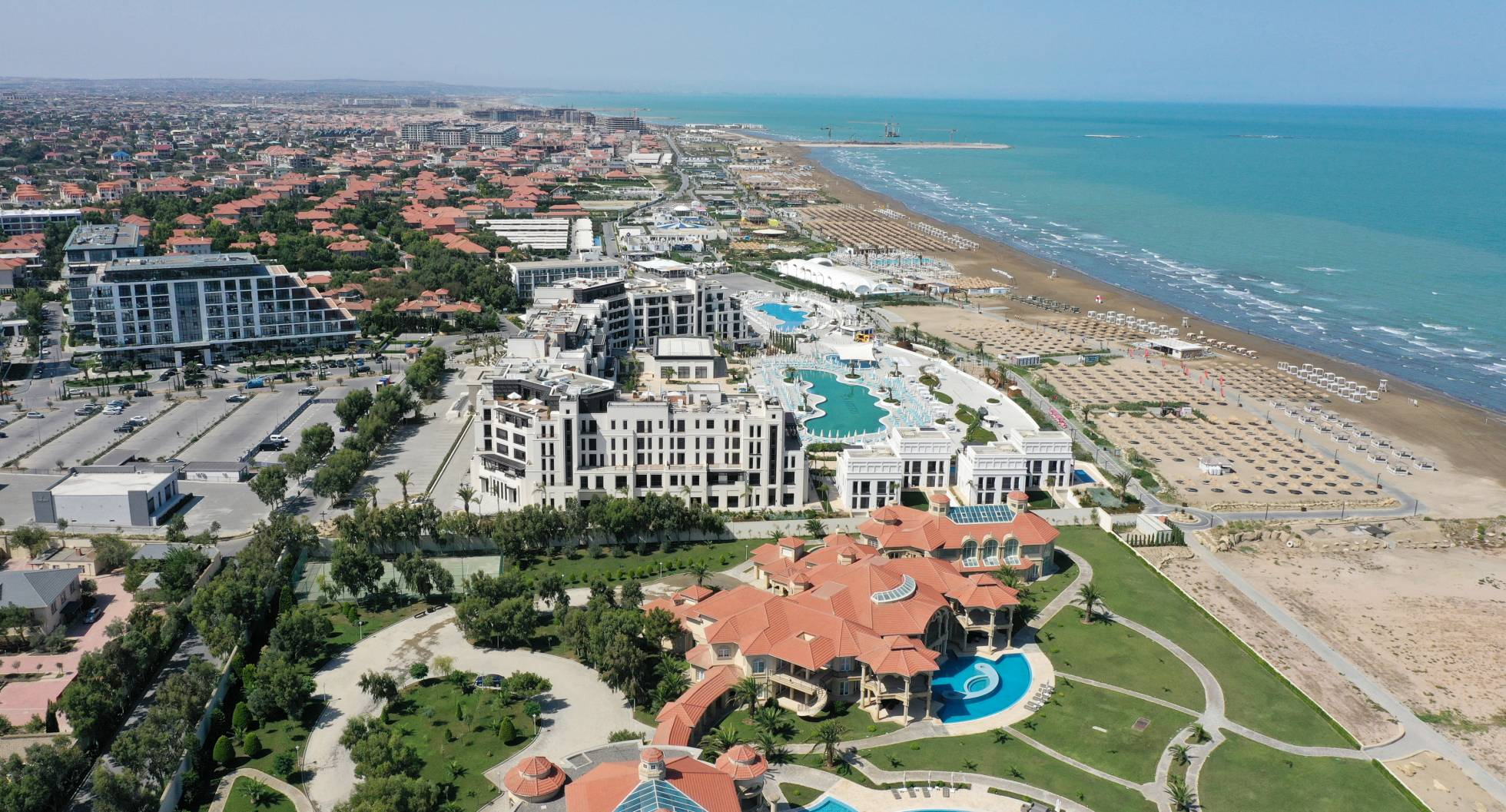
Sea Breeze resort in Baku, Azerbaijan

== Historic monuments ==
=== Baku's Old City ===
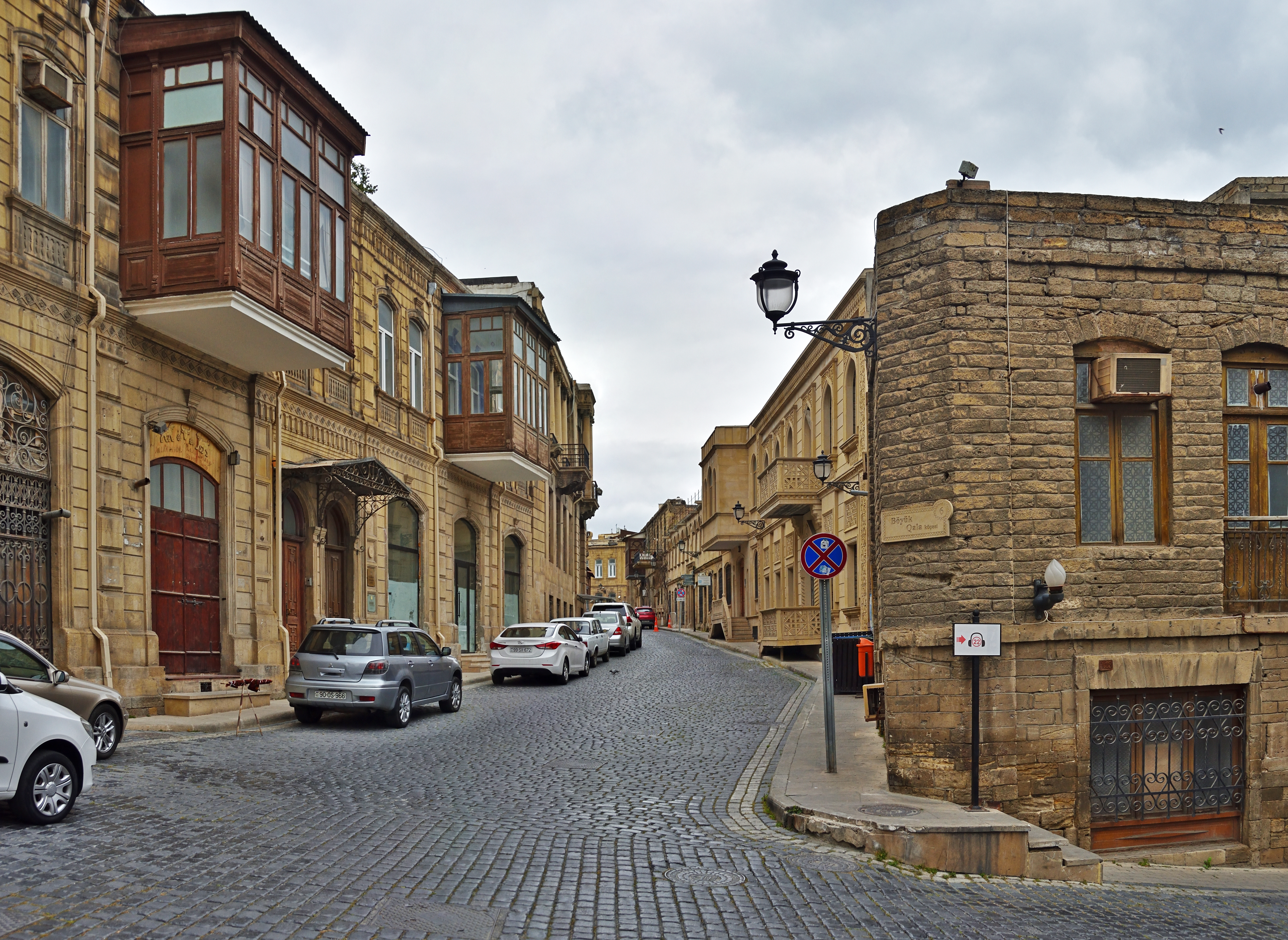
The Old City of Baku is an UNESCO World Heritage Site.

Baku has a number of historic and architectural monuments. The Old City is its ancient core. In December 2000, the Old City (including the Palace of the Shirvanshahs and the Maiden Tower) was named Azerbaijan's first UNESCO World Heritage Site.

The Maiden Tower, in the south-western part of the walled city, was built in two stages. Its bottom part, 13.7 metres (45 ft) high, is dated by most experts to the 6th–7th centuries BC. The tower has a total height of 29.7 metres (97 ft), with a diameter of 16.5 metres (54 ft). The wall is 5 metres (16 ft) thick at the bottom, tapering to 4 metres (13 ft) at the top. The tower has of eight tiers and a 21-metre-deep (69 ft) well. It was built by 12th-century architect Masud ibn Davud, who was probably the father of the architect of the Mardakan Round Tower. Its foundation is believed to be a Sasanid-era Zoroastrian site.

=== Ateshgah of Baku ===
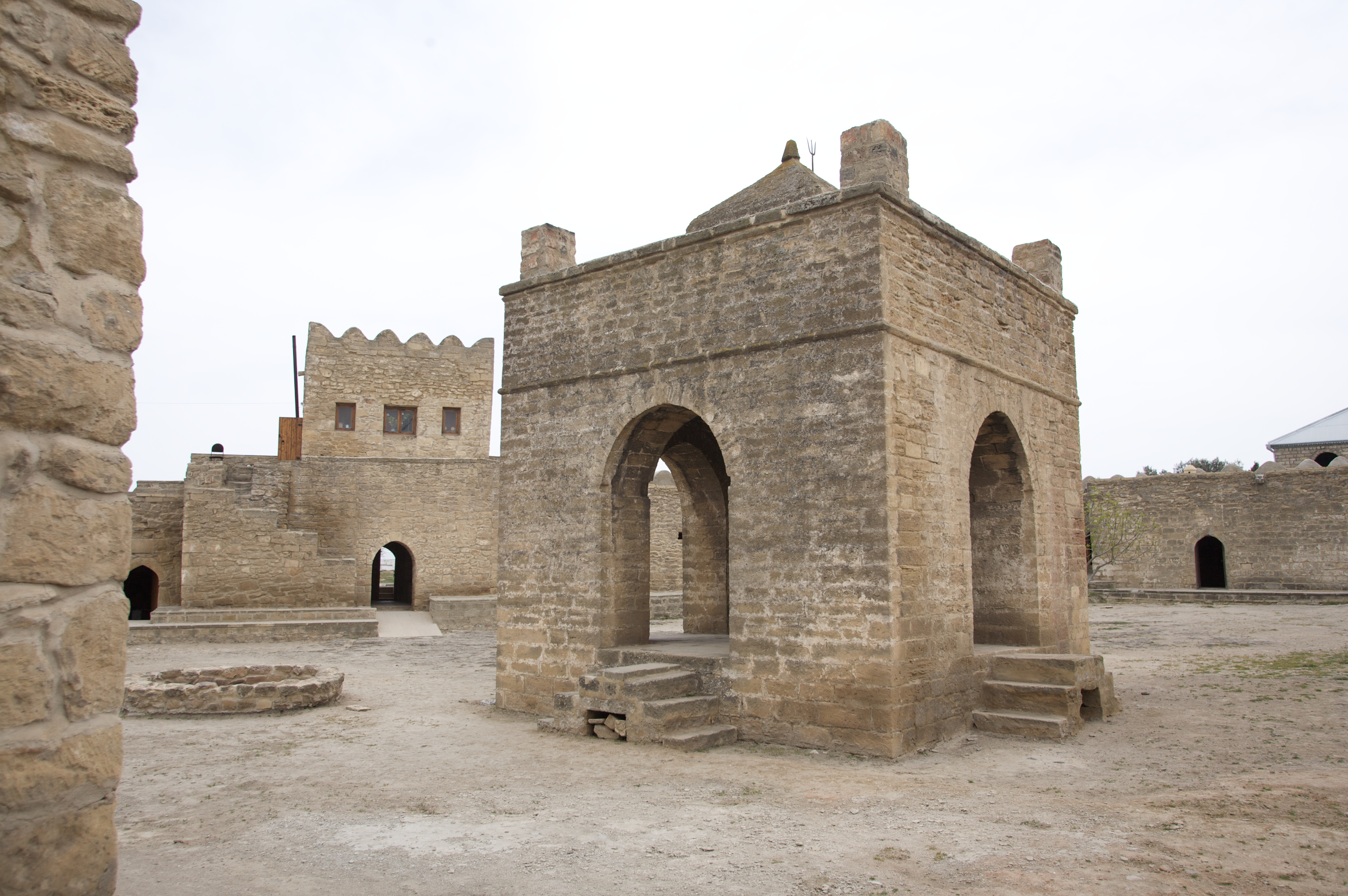
Baku Fire Temple is the only ancient fire temple in the world that has survived to the present day, preserving its original architectural structure.

The Ateshgah of Baku is a temple in the south-western Suraxanı raion on the Absheron Peninsula, 30 kilometres (19 mi) from Baku. West of the Caspian Sea, it was built by Hindu, Sikh and Parsi traders from the Indian subcontinent during the 17th and 18th centuries. Ateshgah is a fire temple, with its central stone shrine on a pocket of natural gas. The present structure was built around 1713, and the central shrine was funded by the merchant Kanchanagaran in 1810.

The Absheron Peninsula is noted for its shallow oil deposits, which trigger natural oil fires. Zoroastrianism has a long history in Azerbaijan, and the region was considered sacred by Zoroastrians due to these natural fires. Scholars have speculated that the temple may have been an ancient Zoroastrian shrine, which was destroyed by invading Islamic armies during the Muslim conquest of Persia and its neighbouring regions.

The complex was converted into a museum in 1975 and receives about 15,000 visitors a year. It was nominated as a World Heritage site in 1998 and was declared a state historical-architectural reserve.

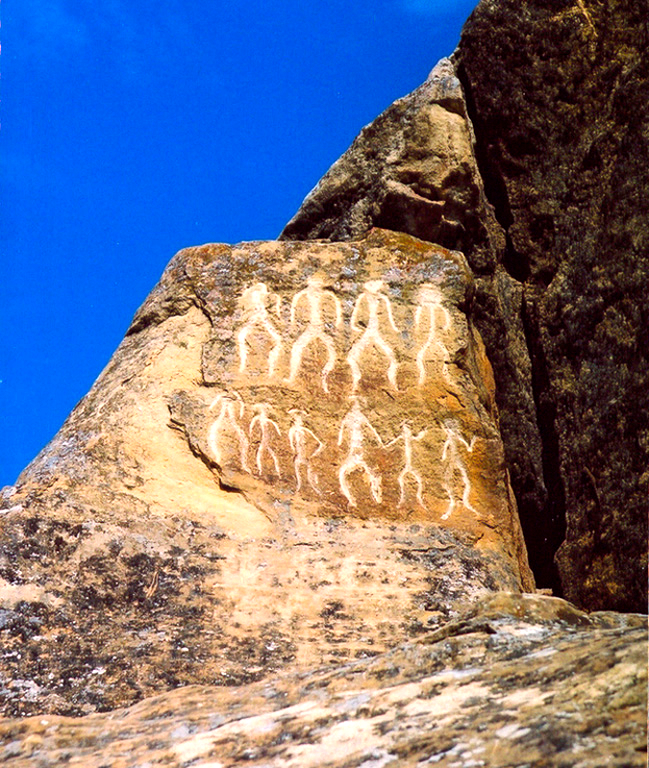
Petroglyphs in Gobustan National Park date back to 10000 BC.

=== Gobustan National Park ===
Gobustan State Historical and Cultural Reserve, located southwest of Baku, is renowned for its ancient rock carvings and unique geological features, including mud volcanoes. Established in 1966, the reserve was designated a national historical landmark to protect its rich archaeological and natural heritage.

Within the park lies the Gobustan Rock Art Cultural Landscape, home to more than 6,000 petroglyphs dating from approximately 5,000 to 40,000 years ago. These rock engravings depict scenes of prehistoric life, including primitive humans, animals, ritual dances, bullfights, boats with armed oarsmen, warriors with lances, camel caravans, and representations of the sun and stars.

The site also contains remnants of inhabited caves, settlements, and burial grounds, reflecting continuous human presence from the Upper Paleolithic period to the Middle Ages. Covering an area of 537 hectares (1,330 acres), the site was inscribed as a UNESCO World Heritage Site in 2007 in recognition of its universal value.

=== Palace of Shaki Khans ===
The Palace of Shaki Khans in Shaki, 246 kilometres (153 mi) from Baku, was a summer residence of the Shaki Khanate which was built in the early 18th century. It features decorative tiles, fountains, and several stained-glass windows. The exterior is decorated with dark blue, turquoise and ochre tiles in geometric patterns; the murals, coloured with tempera, are inspired by the poetry of Nizami Ganjavi.

== Modern architecture ==
The white Heydar Aliyev Center, designed by Pritzker Architecture Prize winner Zaha Hadid, is a symbol of modern Baku. It contains two ornamental pools and an artificial lake.

Heydar Aliyev Center

== Mountain tourism ==
Mountain tourism is a popular attraction in Azerbaijan, particularly during the winter season. Two major mountain resorts, Tufandag in the Gabala district and Shahdag in the Gusar district, have been developed to promote winter tourism and alpine sports. Located at altitudes between 2,500–3,000 metres (8,200–9,800 ft) above sea level.

Shahdag Mountain Resort (named after the Greater Caucasus mountain), about 32 kilometres (20 mi) from Qusar, is Azerbaijan's first ski resort. Tufandag, about 4 kilometres (2.5 mi) from Gabala, has a cable car, skiing, an entertainment center for children and a hotel.

Mountain tourism in Azerbaijan is promoted by the Mountain Sports Club (MSC), established in 1999. Members of the club have undertaken expeditions to notable peaks, including Mount Shahdagh.

The village of Lahij, in the southern Greater Caucasus range of northern Azerbaijan about 1,505 metres (4,938 ft) above sea level, is a center of ancient art. Lahij is known for its forests, mountains, waterfalls, historic monuments and ancient artifacts. Laza is a village at the foot of 4,243-metre (13,921 ft) Mount Shahdagh.

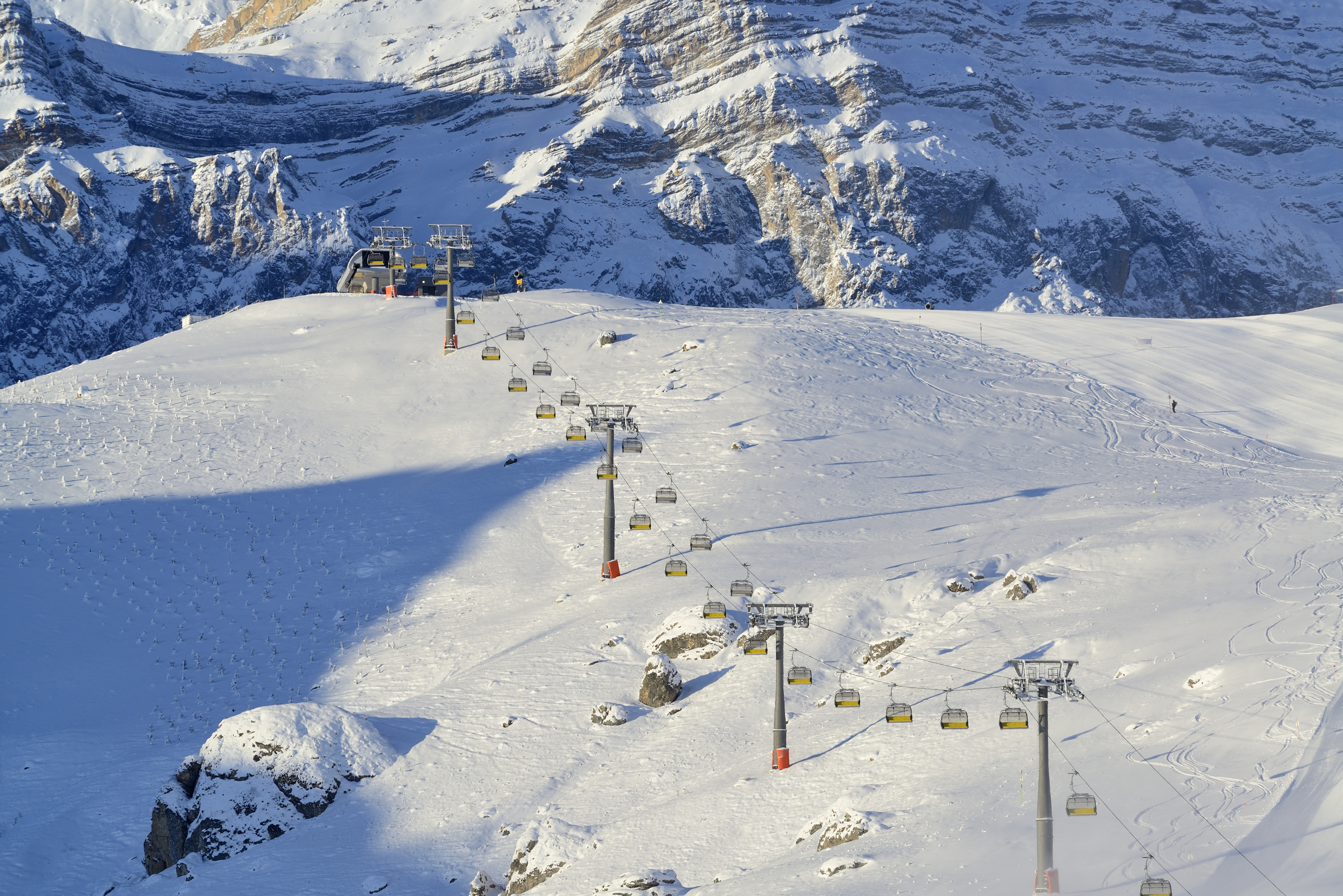
Shahdag Mountain Resort in winter

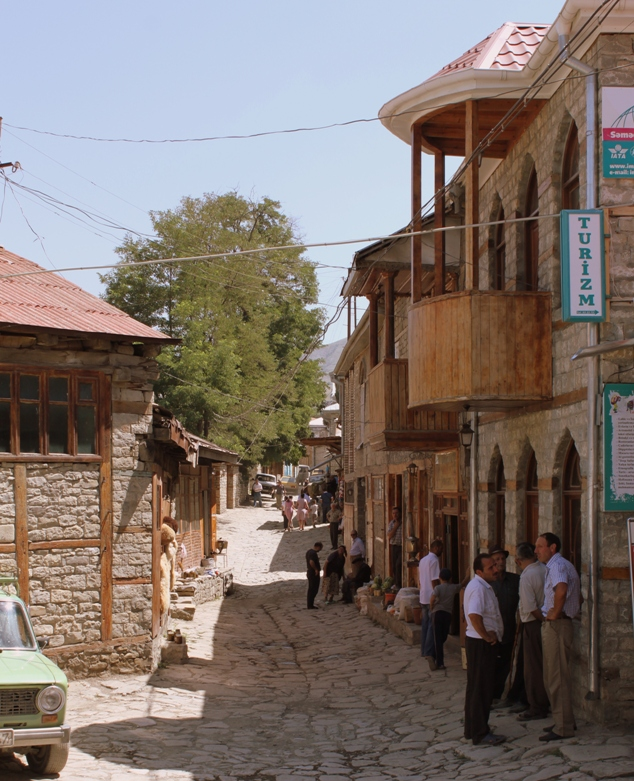
Houses in Lahij, a Tat village

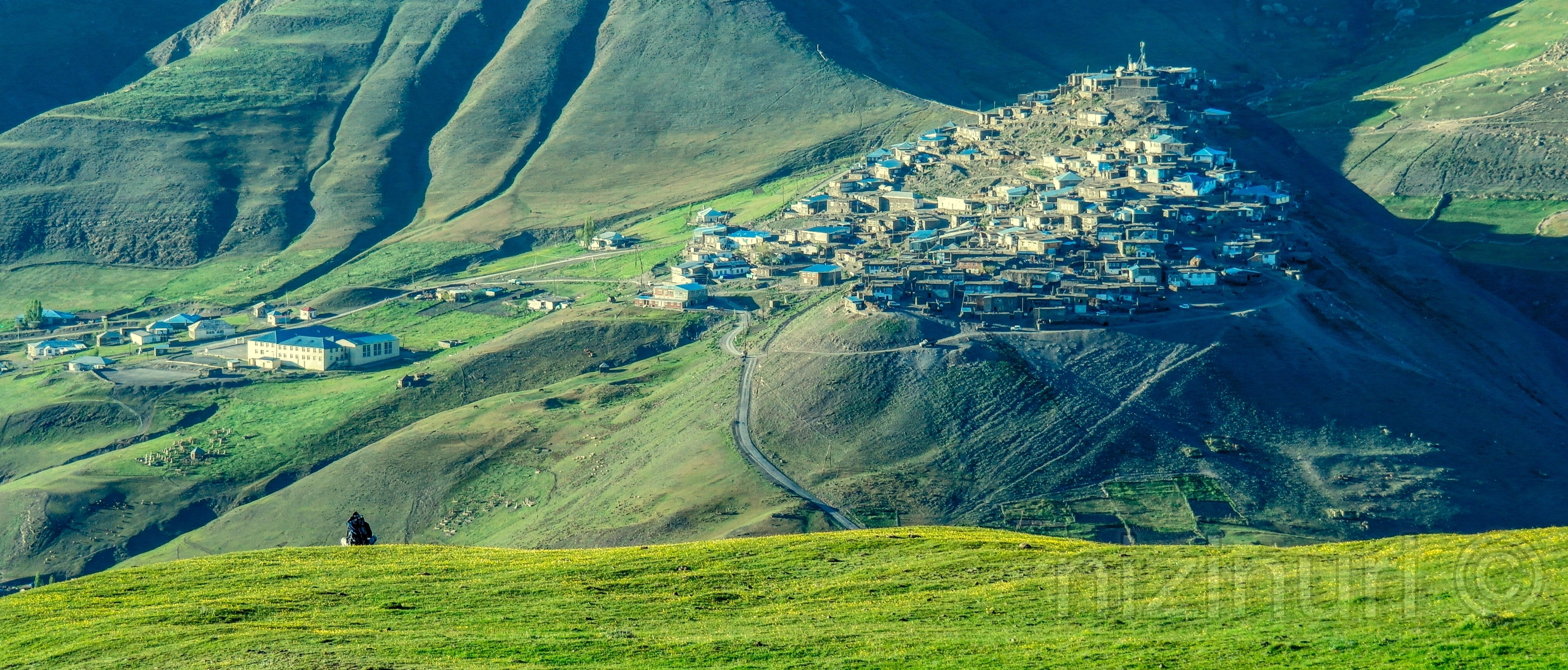
Khinalig village

== National parks ==
In addition to Gobustan State Historical and Cultural Reserve, Azerbaijan has eight other national parks including Zangezur National Park (formerly Ordubad National Park), which was renamed and expanded in 2009.

The semi-arid Shirvan National Park has a lake covering about 40 square kilometres (15 sq mi).

Ag-Gel National Park, also semi-arid, is on the Mil plain of the Kura-Aras lowland. Over 140 species of birds are found there, including 89 species of nesting birds such as partridge, spoonbill, swan, teal and bustard. The park is on the Ramsar Convention list of internationally important wetlands.

Hirkan National Park is on the Lankaran Lowland and in the Talysh Mountains.

Altyaghach National Park is 90.5% covered by temperate deciduous broadleaf forest.

The Soviet-era predecessor of Absheron National Park was the Absheron State Nature Preserve which was created in July 1969.

Shahdag National Park, in northern Azerbaijan on the border with Russia and Georgia, was created in 2006. The World Bank allocated a $17 million loan and $8 million grant in 2007, and the government of Japan provided an $8 million grant for the southern Caucasus' largest national park.

Göygöl National Park.was created in 2008.

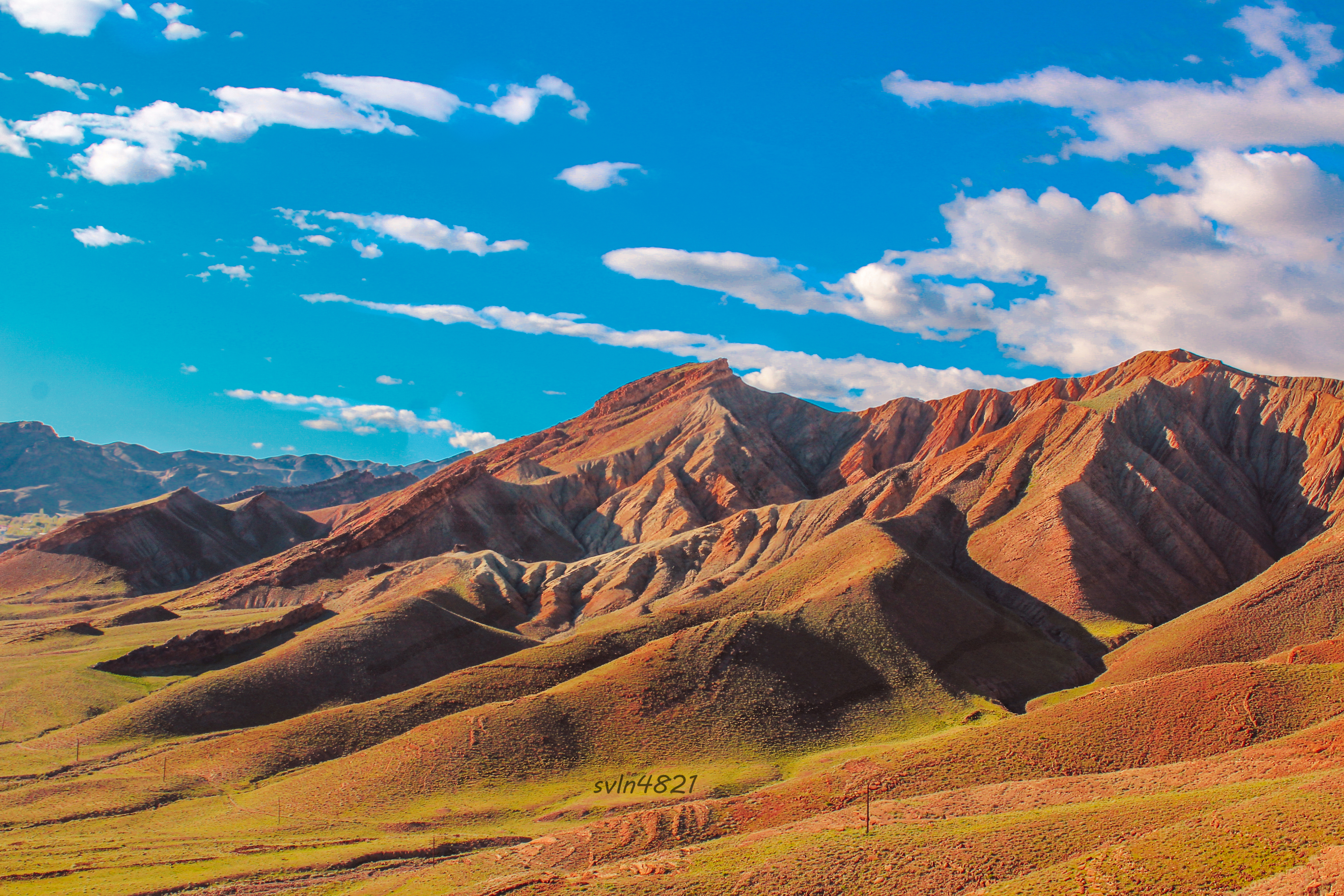
Zangezur National Park

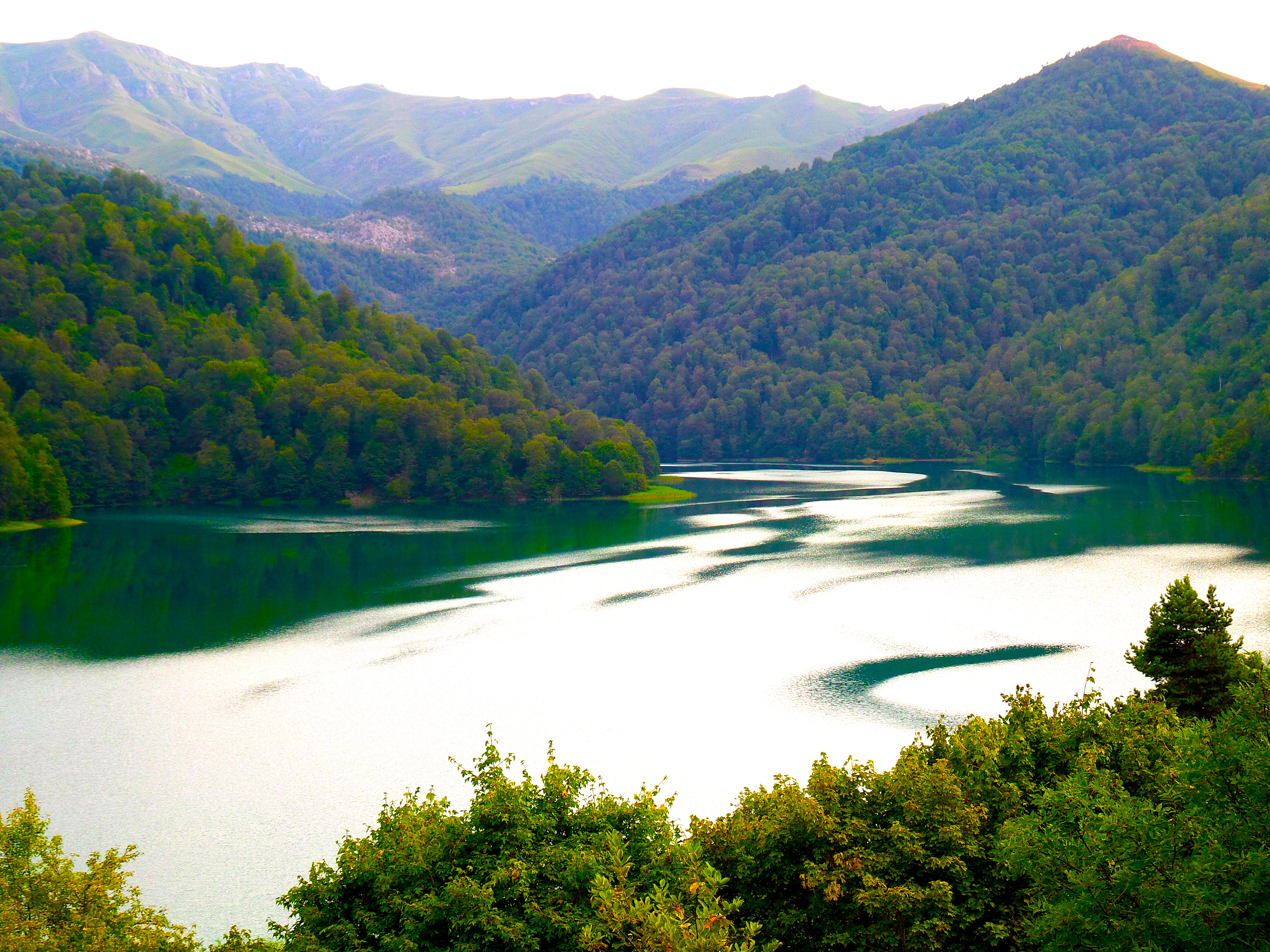
Göygöl National Park

== Museums ==
Most museums are located in major cities, such as Baku (including the Baku Museum of Miniature Books), Ganja, Nakhchivan, Sumgait, Lankaran, Mingachevir and Shaki.

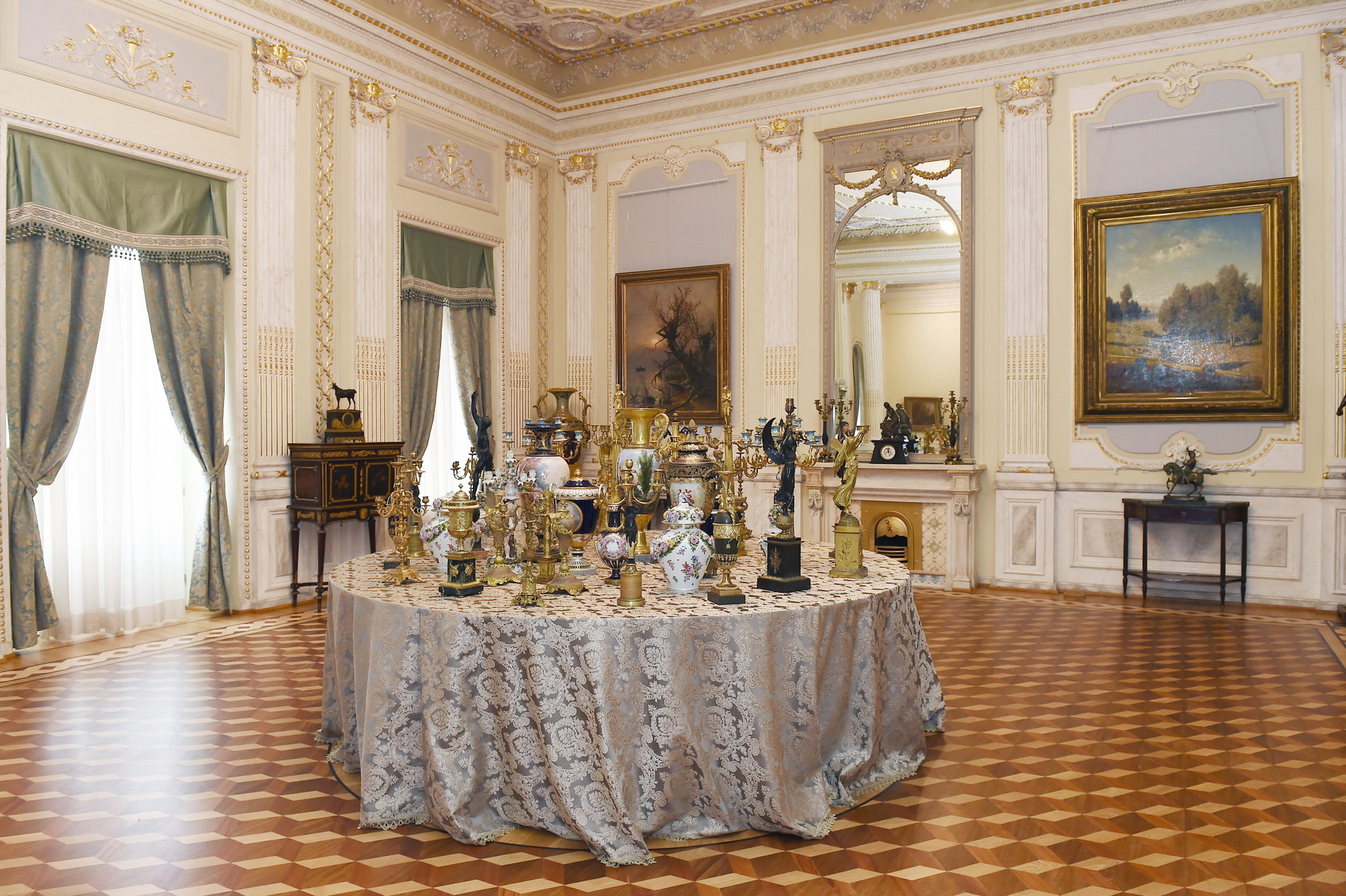
National Art Museum of Azerbaijan

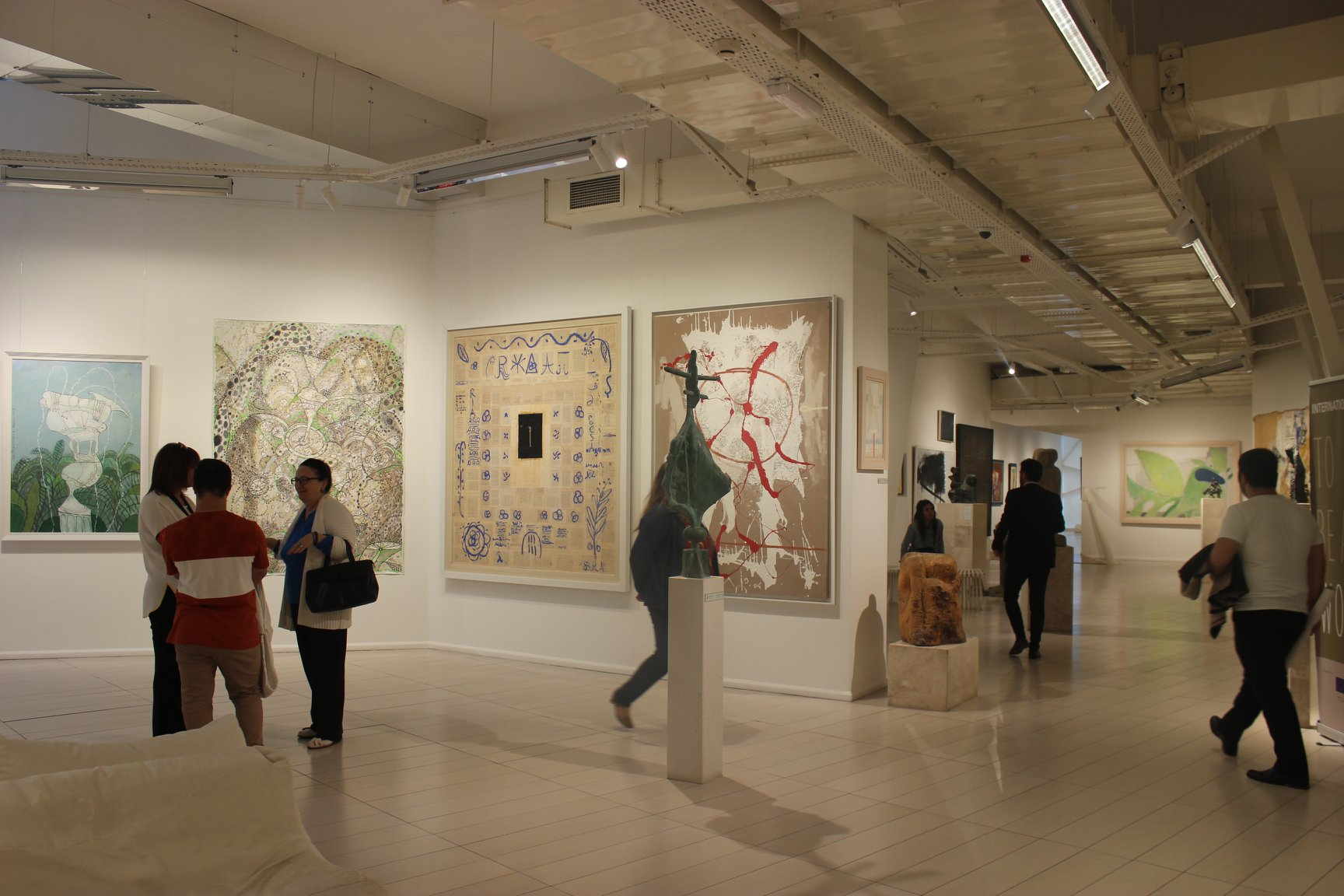
Baku Museum of Modern Art

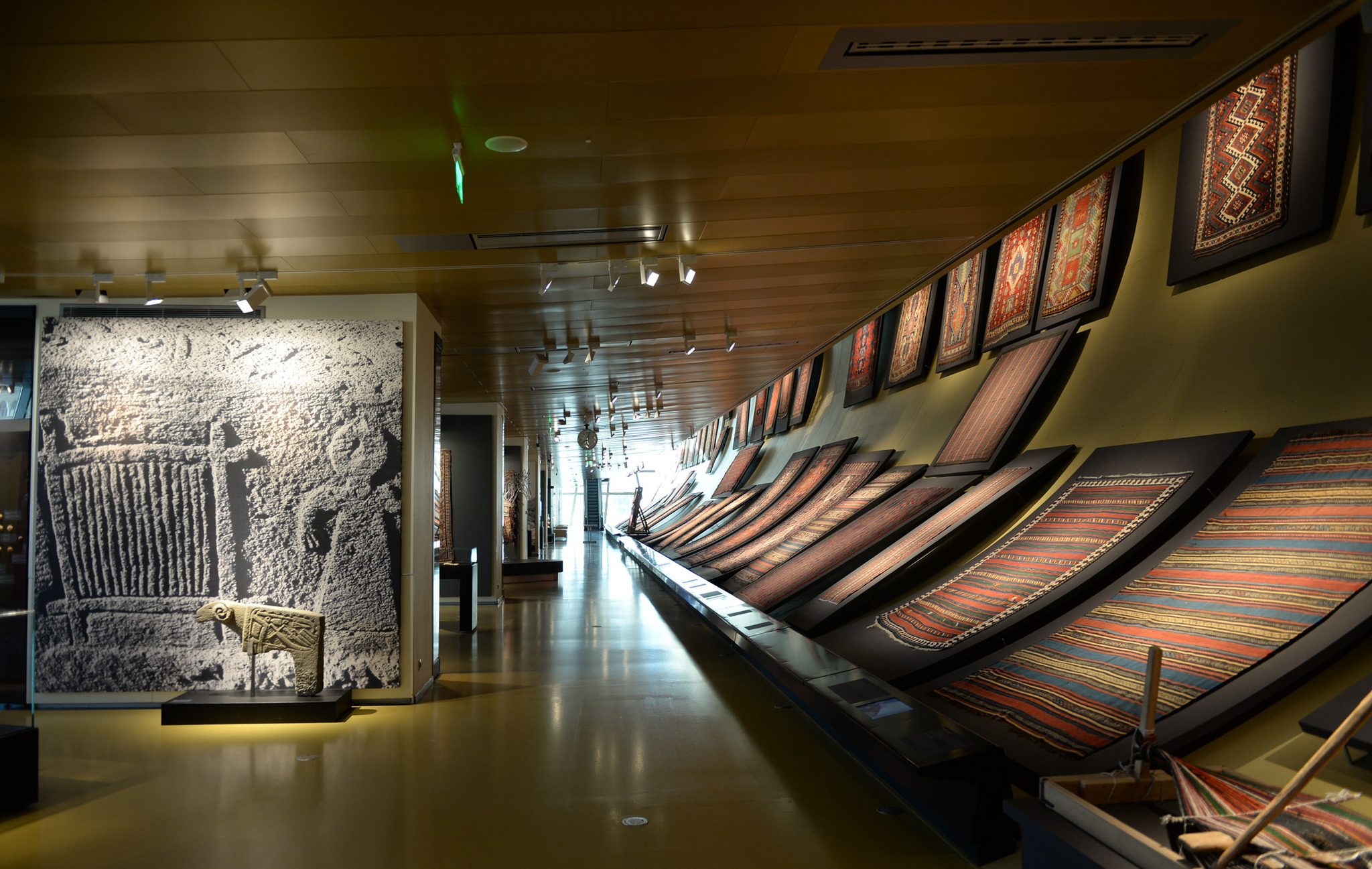
Azerbaijan Carpet Museum

== Hunting ==
Azerbaijan permits the hunting of Dagestan goat, wild boar, rabbit, forest dove, quail, partridge, water birds (goose, duck, coot), woodcock, and chamois. Hunting is prohibited in the Aghdam, Khanlar, Goranboy, Dashkasan, Gadabay and Ter Ter regions, the Caspian Sea islands, green zones, protected areas and near cities and resort areas.

== See also ==
- Culture of Azerbaijan
- Tourism in Baku
- Ministry of Culture (Azerbaijan)
- State Tourism Agency of the Republic of Azerbaijan
