= Samur-Yalama National Park =

Samur-Yalama National Park Samur-Yalama Milli Parkı
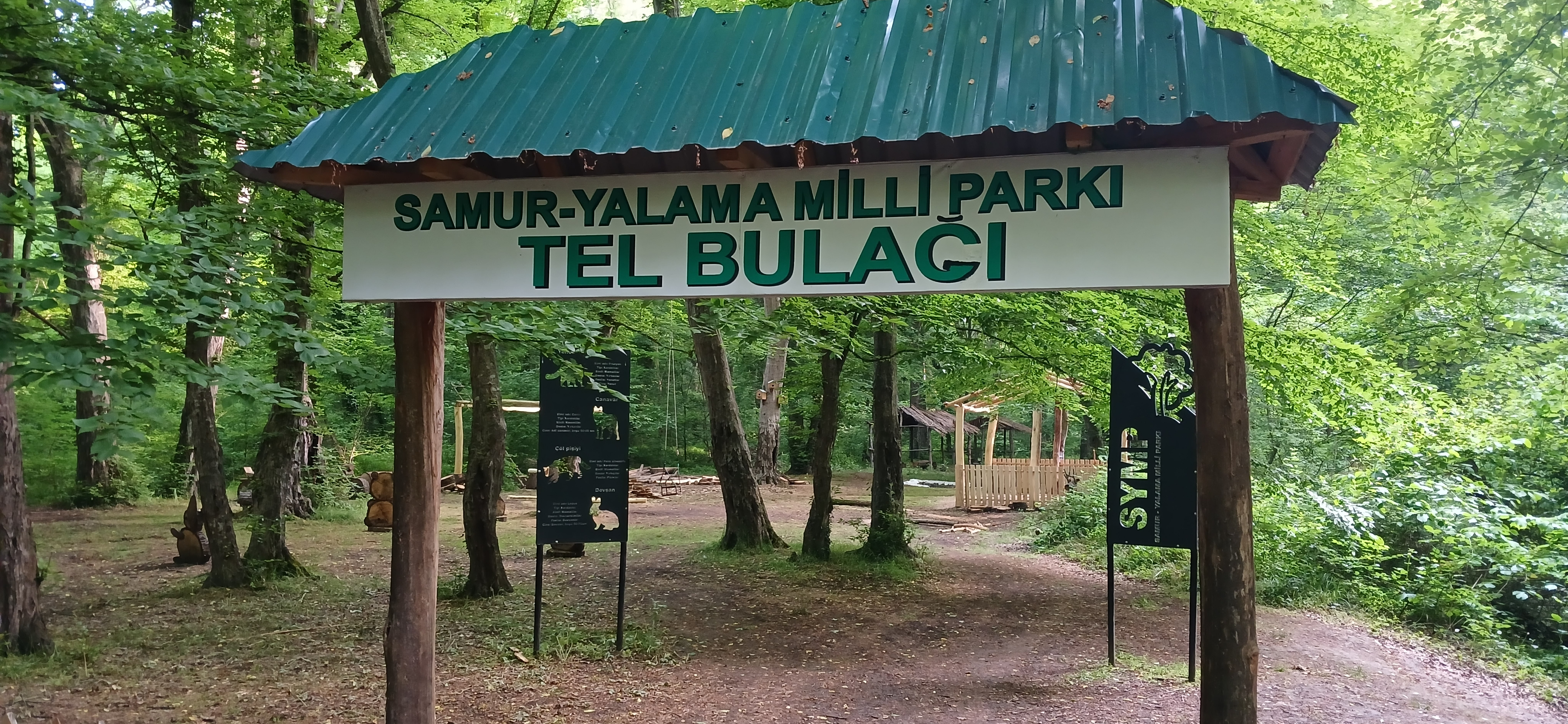

- Location within Azerbaijan
- 41°48′50″N 48°34′50″E
- Location: Khachmaz Rayon

Site notes
- Area: 11,772.45 hectares (117.7245 km^{2})
- Governing body: Republic of Azerbaijan; Ministry of Ecology and Natural Resources

Samur-Yalama National Park is a national park of Azerbaijan. It was established on November 5, 2012, within the territory of Khachmaz Rayon administrative districts. Its surface area is 11,772.45 hectares (117.7245 km^{2}).

The park's goal is preservation of the biological and genetic diversity of several unique natural areas, as well as the historical-cultural objects of the region. Another aim is the development of eco-tourism and recreation. Some tourist routes start in Yalama.

== Description ==
The largest portion of the park is in the Caspian coastal zone, which is heavily forested. Several landscapes can be found: littoral landscapes, wooded landscapes, forest-bush landscapes, bushes and arid steppe landscapes. There are four climate zones, with different amounts of rainfall: in the coastal zones less than 350 mm, and in the inland zones more than 450 mm. The soil varies form very sandy to very clayed.

== Flora and fauna ==
=== Flora ===
The dominant tree species are chestnut oak and Persian ironwood.

=== Fauna ===
Some characteristic species are black kite, eastern imperial eagle, otter, reed cat, lynx, chamois, Caspian red deer and brown bear.

In the coastal waters belonging to the national park, stellate sturgeon, brown trout, eel, pikeperch and Caspian kutum can be found.

== See also ==
- Nature of Azerbaijan
- National Parks of Azerbaijan
- State Reserves of Azerbaijan
- List of protected areas of Azerbaijan
