= Ministry of Ecology and Natural Resources =

Ministry of Ecology and Natural Resources may refer to:

- Ministry of Ecology and Natural Resources (Ukraine)
- Ministry of Ecology and Natural Resources (Azerbaijan)
