= Turian-Chay State Reserve =

National park

Coordinates: 40°46′09″N 47°24′54″E

- Interactive map of Turian-Chay State Reserve
- Area: 225 km^{2}
- Governing body: Republic of Azerbaijan

Turian-Chay State Reserve or Turyanchay State Reserve was established on the area of 126.3 square kilometres in 1958.

The reserve area was expanded to 225 km^{2} in January 2003.

The Turian-Chay State Reserve was established for the protection and restoration of arid-arch light forest and other natural resources; and for the localization of centers of erosion at the foothills. The reserve is situated on the spurs of the Buz-Dag Ridge, in the southern foothills of the Major Caucasus, on the right bank of the Turian-Chay river in the Agdash area of the country. Its territory lies at a height of 400–650 m above sea level and extends for 35 km from east to west and for 5 km from north to south.

The reserve is situated in an area of semi-desert and arid light forests, which mainly consist of pistachio, juniper, oak, having an important soil protecting, water protecting and climatic significance. In the relief of the reserve lowland mountains dominate with the peaks: Pirsei-Dag (609 m), Nulbon-Dag (437 m), Archan-Dag (476 m), Olmes-Dag (544 m) and others. As a rule they have steep, in some places denudated eroded slopes, and are separated by deep narrow valleys. The northern slopes are more gentle and covered with forests; the southern slopes are steep and strongly eroded. The general process of wind erosion has developed on the territory of the reserve.

On the territory of the reserve 60 species of trees and bushes grow. The main types of sparsely growing trees are: pistacia, fudian juniper (Juniper polucarpus), prickly juniper (Juniperus oxicedrus), Quercus iberica, ash-tree, Celtis caucasicus and pomegranate. Moreover, Populus, willow, alder, Elaeagnus and other trees also grow in this area. Two dendraflora species of the reserve – Juniperus and pomegranate are included in the Red Book. There are 24 species of mammals and 112 species of birds, 20 species of reptiles and 3 species of amphibians in the reserve. Among the birds there are partridge (Alectoris kakelik), pigeons, Cercheneis tinnunculus, griffon (Gyps fulvus), black vulture (Aegypius monachus) and others. Among mammals there are wild boar, brown bear, badger, stone marten, lynx, jackal, European wild cat, hare and others. Among reptiles there are amongst others Macrovipera lebetina. Along the former river- beds and channels the Caspian turtle can be found, and on the slopes of the mountain the spur-thighed tortoise can be observed, which, as well as the Coluber caucasicus is included in the Red Book.

The main protected objects are the model natural complexes of the Boz-Dag Ridge with the developed pistachio-arch light forests, area of semi-desert, arid and tugay vegetation. The state of arid light forest on the Boz-Dag are of great concern primary primarily because in spite of the productivity of the majority of tree species, including juniper, the regeneration of these forests in general is very slow. The establishment of the Turian-Chay reserve brought an improvement in the situation with the regeneration of these forests. During the 40 years of the reserve's existence the pistachio-juniper light forest has extended its area and the general quality of trees has increased. The replacement of juniper by pistachio has almost stopped. Shrubbery and herbage have also developed well, considerably reducing the process of soil erosion.

== See also ==
- Nature of Azerbaijan
- National Parks of Azerbaijan
- State Reserves of Azerbaijan
- State Game Reserves of Azerbaijan
