= Shamakhi Safari Park =

Safari park in Azerbaijan

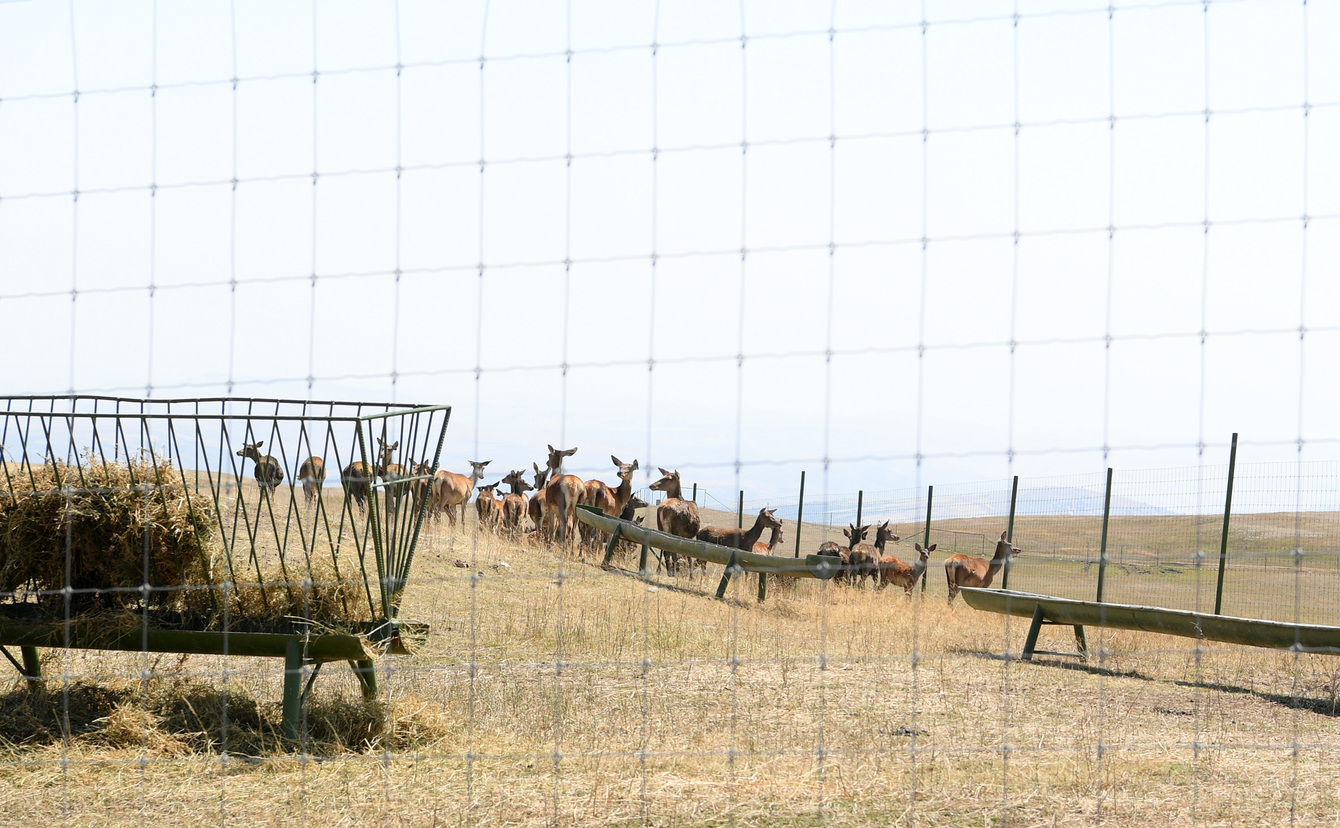
Shamakji Safari Park

Shamakhi Safari Park was created in accordance with "Strategic Road Map on the development of specialized tourism industry in Azerbaijan". The opening of the Shamakhi Safari Park took place on October 2, 2017.

== Description ==
It is known that the first such park was created in Africa. In Azerbaijan, an ecological reserve for wild animals is located in the Shamakhi region, in the territory of a mountain-wooded area called Pirgulu. Currently, this Safari Park covers 620 hectares (including 480 hectares of fenced territory).

420 animals of three genetically valuable animals were brought to the park from Latvia, Poland, Slovakia, the Czech Republic, and Hungary: red deer, mouflon, and fallow deer. As a result of the selection and veterinary measures, the number of these animals has almost doubled, and now the number of animals exceeds 1000. Currently, the park has 790 animals, including 260 red deer, 250 mouflons, and 280 fallow deer. In order to protect deer, fallow deer and mouflon from external influences and infectious diseases, 52-kilometer fencing was built. In addition, the park has created a large number of natural shelters to protect them from cold, wind, precipitation due to the seasons.

== Infrastructure ==
In order to create an environmental infrastructure within the park, a 36-kilometer-wide road has been laid. In addition, many natural nourishments have been made for the animals. A 52-kilometer-long fence has been built on reinforced concrete pillars to protect deer and mouflon deer from external influences and infectious diseases. In addition, an administrative building and a guest house were also built on the territory of the park. Extensive renovation works were carried out in the administrative building and guest house.

== Tours ==
The Shamakhi Safari Park and the Ministry of Education of Azerbaijan concluded an agreement, on the basis of which, starting from September 2018, school trips to the Safari Park will be organized every week. For schoolchildren entry is free.

== See also ==
- Safari park
- National parks of Azerbaijan
