= Ag-Gel National Park =

National park in Azerbaijan

Ag-Gel National Park Ağ göl Milli Parkı
- Location within Azerbaijan
- 40°00′33″N 47°39′00″E
- Location: Ağcabədi Rayon; Beyləqan Rayon

Site notes
- Area: 17,924 hectares (179.24 km^{2})
- Governing body: Republic of Azerbaijan; Ministry of Ecology and Natural Resources

Ag-Gel National Park (Azerbaijani: Ağ göl Milli Parkı) — is a national park of Azerbaijan. It was established in an area in Ağcabədi Rayon and Beyləqan Rayon administrative districts on July 5, 2003, on the basis of the former "Ag-Gol State Reserve" and "Ag-Gol State Game Reserve" which it superseded, on a surface area of 17,924 hectares (179.24 km^{2}).

A big part of the national park is the Lake Ağgöl, an internationally recognized area of global importance which was declared an Important Bird Area (IBA) when it was placed in the list of Ramsar wetlands of international importance in 2001.

== Description ==
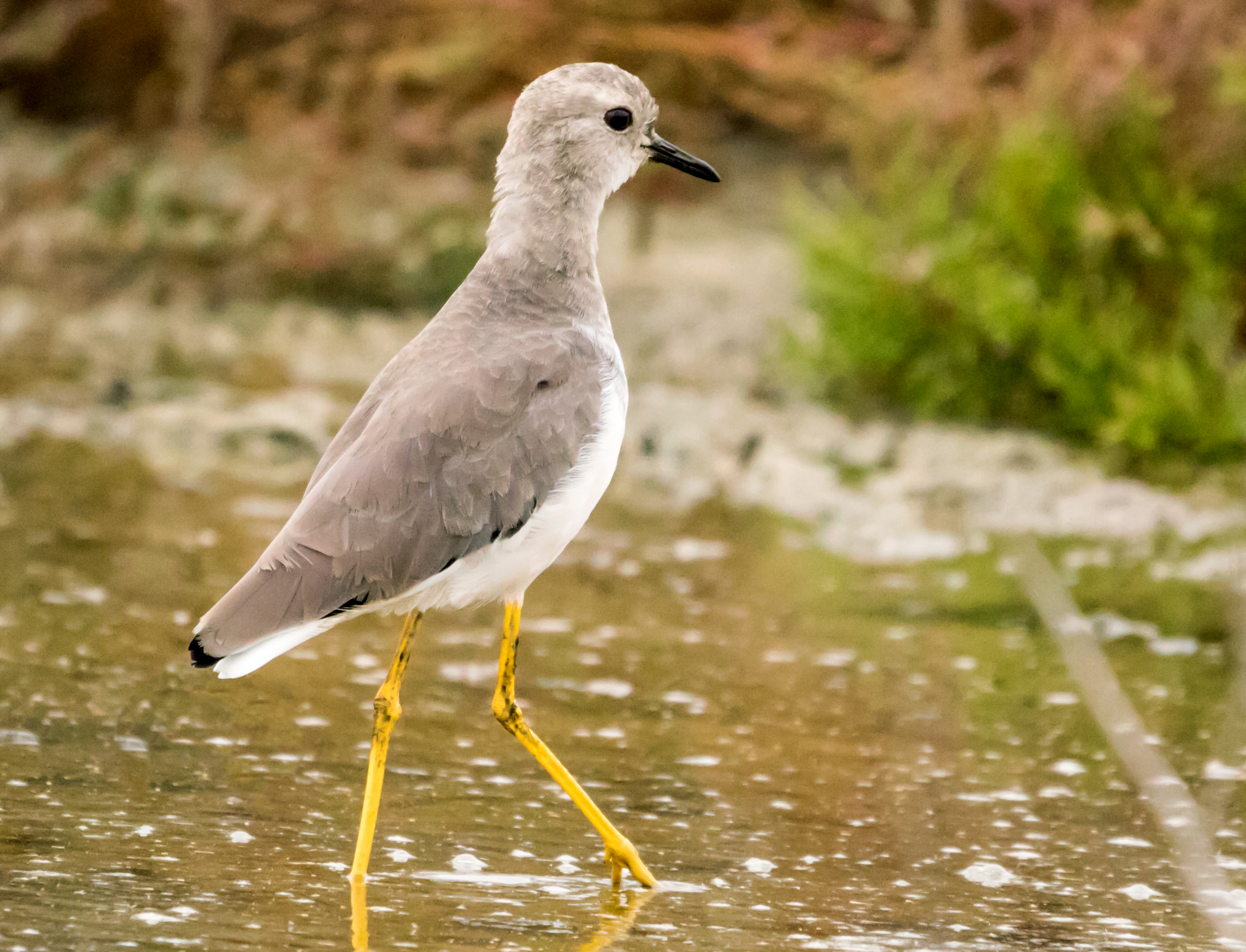
White-tailed lapwing in Ag-Gel

Ag-Gol, situated in the Mil plain of the Kur-Araz lowlands has a semi-desert landscape and is an important overwintering and nesting place for birds. Over 140 species of birds are found in the park, including 89 species of nesting birds (partridge, spoonbill, swan, teal, bustard, etc.). Approximately 30 specimens of charadriiformes and 24 specimens of anseriformers have chosen this reserve home for themselves. Some of the bird species living here such as Francolinus, white-tailed eagle, great white pelicans (Pelicanus onocrotalus) and Dalmatian pelicans (Pelicanus crispus) are added to the Red Book of Azerbaijan.

In addition to birds, the reserve is rich with 20 fish species such as pike, erythroculter, mongolicus and carp. However, it was much richer for its fish species in the past as it was connected with the River Kura. Furthermore, there are green toad, hylidae and lake trod in the reserve. Besides, it is possible to see the Caspian and swamp turtles, common and water grass snakes in the reserve.

Moreover, 22 species of mammals such as wild boar, coypu and jungle cat (Felis chaus) occur in the reserve.

The park is designed to protect the marshy ecological system, as the nesting and wintering places of migratory and water birds. Ag-Gol has been incorporated into the list of UNESCO's convention "On internationally important marshy areas as the residing places of birds"

== See also ==
- Gizil-Agach State Reserve
- Nature of Azerbaijan
- National Parks of Azerbaijan
- State Reserves of Azerbaijan
- List of protected areas of Azerbaijan
