= Göygöl National Park =

Göygöl National Park Göygöl Milli Parkı
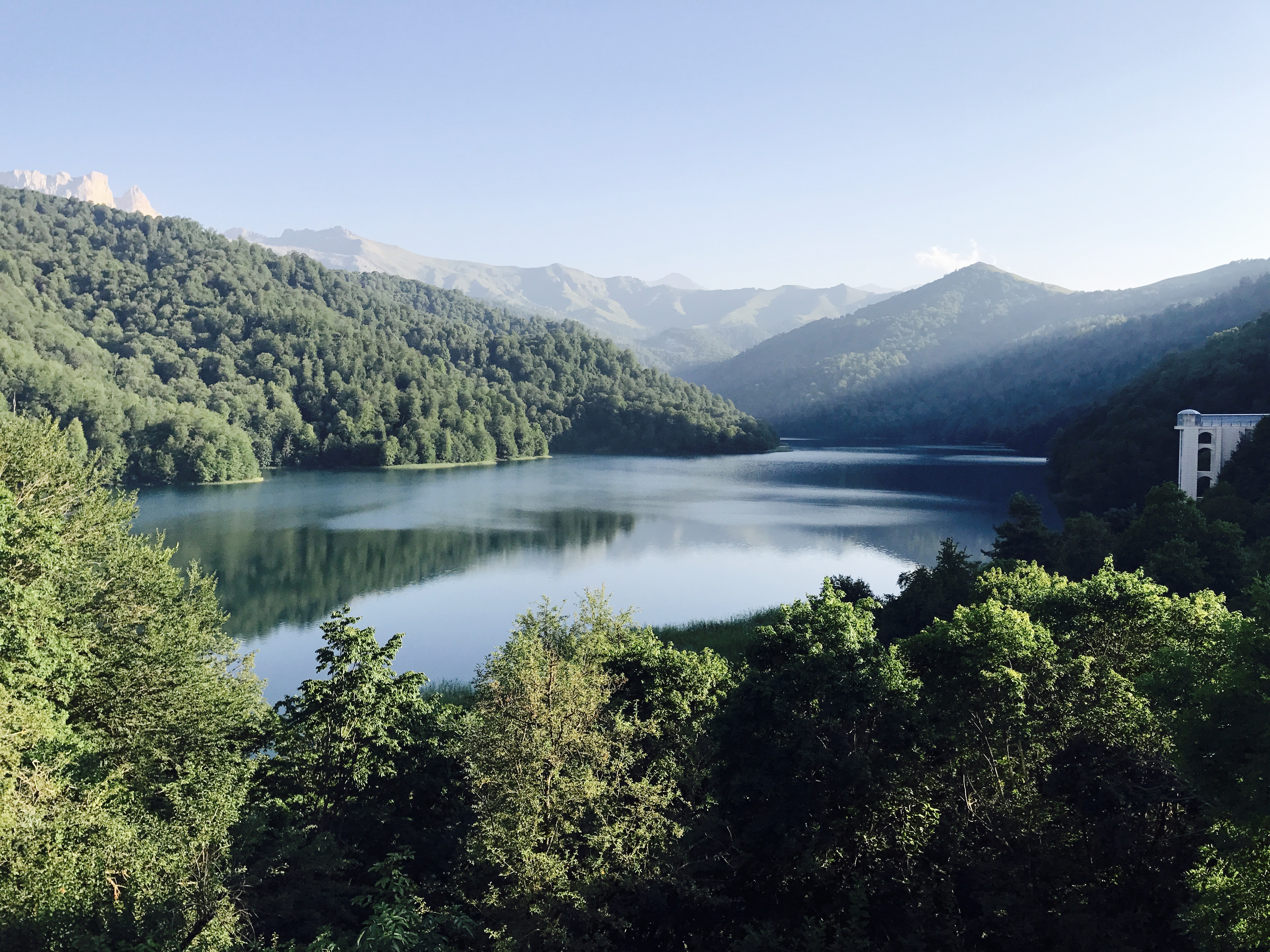
- Lake Göygöl

- Location within Azerbaijan
- 40°24′21″N 46°19′21″E
- Location: Goygol Rayon

Site notes
- Area: 12,755 hectares (127.55 km^{2})
- Governing body: Republic of Azerbaijan; Ministry of Ecology and Natural Resources

Göygöl National Park (Azerbaijani: Göygöl Milli Parkı) is a national park of Azerbaijan. It was established in an area in Goygol Rayon administrative district on April 1, 2008, on the basis of the former "Goy Gol State Reserve" that was established in 1925 and which it superseded, on a surface area of 12,755 hectares (127.55 km^{2}). It was enlarged from 6,739 hectares (67.39 km^{2}) of the former state reserve to its current surface area as a national park. The park is the most visited in the country.

The national park includes one of the most beautiful and cleanest lakes in Azerbaijan, Lake Göygöl. The reserve is intended to protect the natural ecosystem of the subalpine zones of the northern slopes of the Lesser Caucasus. During the Soviet era, it had been deprived of its reserve status, but was restored later.

== Flora and fauna ==
=== Flora ===
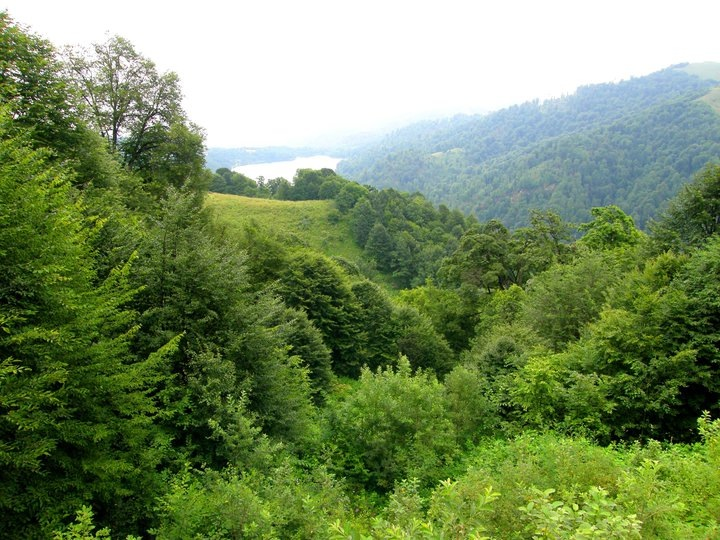
Forest in Göygöl National Park

The area of Göygöl is almost entirely covered by forests and has a rich flora with over 420 plant species, including 20 which are endemic to the area. The major types of trees are chestnut-leaved oak (Quercus castaneifolia), Caucasian oak (Quercus macranthera), Caucasian ash (Fraxinus angustifolia subsp. oxycarpa), European ash (Fraxinus excelsior), European hornbeam (Carpinus betulus), Oriental hornbeam (Carpinus orientalis), Oriental beech (Fagus orientalis), velvet maple (Acer velutinum), Cappadocian maple (Acer cappadocicum), Caucasian lime tree (Tilia dasystyla subsp. caucasica), etc.

Shrub species occurring in the area include the medlar (Crataegus pontica), European barberry (Berberis vulgaris), European cornel (Cornus mas), European spindle (Euonymus europaeus), blackberry (Rubus fruticosus), etc.

=== Fauna ===
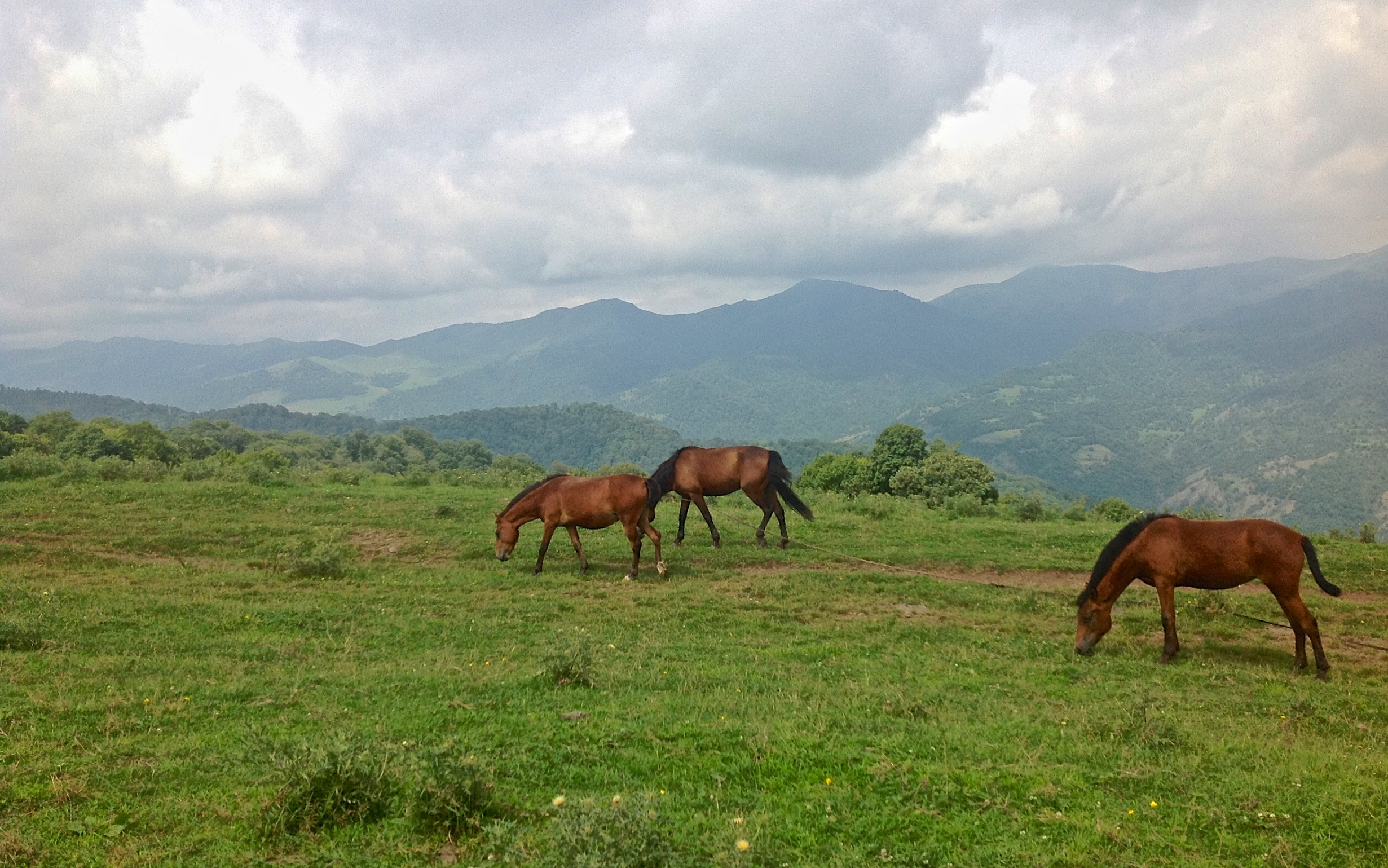
Horses in Göygöl National Park

There are several endemic subspecies of birds, of which the bearded vulture (Gypaetus barbatus), Egyptian vulture (Neophron percnopterus), Eurasian eagle-owl (Bubo bubo), black woodpecker (Dryocopus martius), golden oriole (Oriolus oriolus), mistle thrush (Turdus viscivorus), stock dove (Columba oenas), Eurasian woodcock (Scolopax rusticola), woodlark (Lullula arborea), mute swan (Cygnus olor), common quail (Coturnix coturnix), Caspian titmouse (Poecile hyrcanus) subspecies of the titmouse; the Caucasus pheasant (Phasianus colchicus) subspecies of the common pheasant are common.

The Caspian tiger (Panthera tigris virgata) once roamed these mountains, but is now extinct. Other large mammals here are the lynx (Lynx lynx), brown bear (Ursus arctos), wild boar (Sus scrofa), wolf (Canis lupus), golden jackal (Canis aureus), jungle cat (Felis chaus), red fox (Vulpes vulpes), roe deer (Capreolus capreolus), badger (Meles meles), etc.

The Persian leopard (Panthera pardus tulliana) subspecies of the leopard, lives in the southern regions in Azerbaijan, primarily in the Talysh Mountains, Nagorno-Karabakh and Nakhichevan. Despite occasional sightings, it was not clear whether leopards had been extinct in Azerbaijan by the late 1990s until a species was caught on camera in March, 2007 in the Hirkan National Park. However it is still not clear if leopards live in the Göygöl National Park.

== Filmography ==
A documentary film titled "Göygöl Milli Parkı" (Goygol National Park) was shot in 2015. The film was presented in the Nizami Cinema Center in Baku. Vice-president of the Heydar Aliyev Foundation Leyla Aliyeva attended the film screening.

== See also ==
- Nature of Azerbaijan
- National Parks of Azerbaijan
- State Reserves of Azerbaijan
- List of protected areas of Azerbaijan
