= Absheron National Park =

Absheron National Park Abşeron Milli Parkı
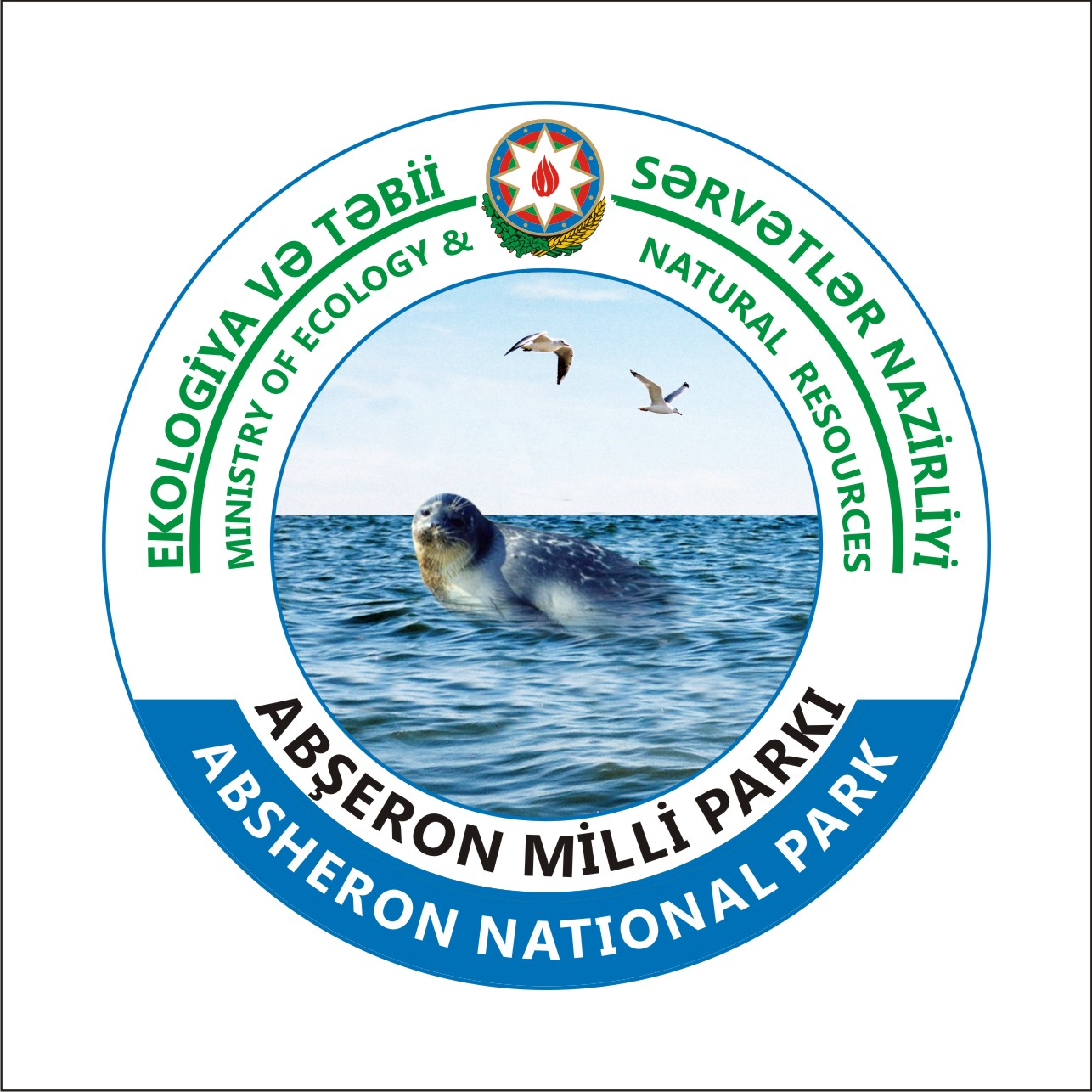
- Logo of the park

- Location within Azerbaijan
- 40°17′01″N 50°21′34″E
- Location: Baku

Site notes
- Area: 783 hectares (7.83 km^{2})
- Governing body: Republic of Azerbaijan; Ministry of Ecology and Natural Resources

Absheron National Park (Azerbaijani: Abşeron Milli Parkı) is a national park of Azerbaijan in the Caspian Hyrcanian mixed forests' ecoregion. It was established on 8 February 2005, on an area of 783 hectares (7.83 km^{2}) in the administrative territory of the District of Azizbeyov (now Khazar) in the City of Baku, on the base of Absheron State Nature Preserve. Absheron was the country's most visited park by foreign tourists in the first three months of 2024.

== Fauna and flora ==
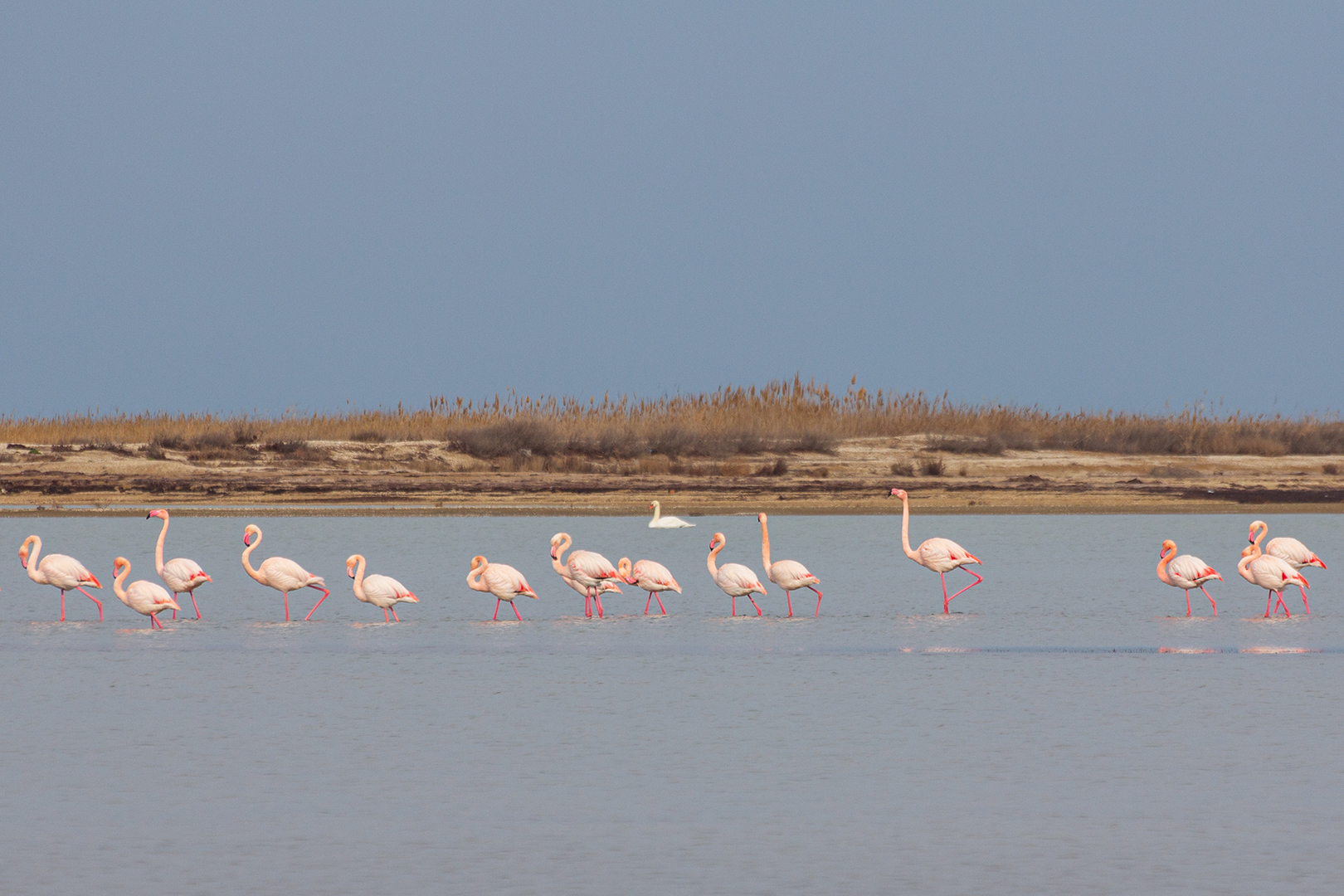
Flamingos in Absheron National Park

The Absheron State Nature Preserve was created in July 1969 in order to protect gazelles, Caspian seals and waterbirds that inhabit the territory. The climate of the area is semi-arid, specific to semi-desert and dry steppe. Types and phytomass of flora is poor here, plants are changed respective of water and saltiness regime of area. Sea coastal sand plants (42,6%), meadows with jigilgamish and paz grass (13,2 %), one-year saline grasses (5,2 %) etc. are spread. Ephemeras also develop well in early spring.

=== List of fauna ===
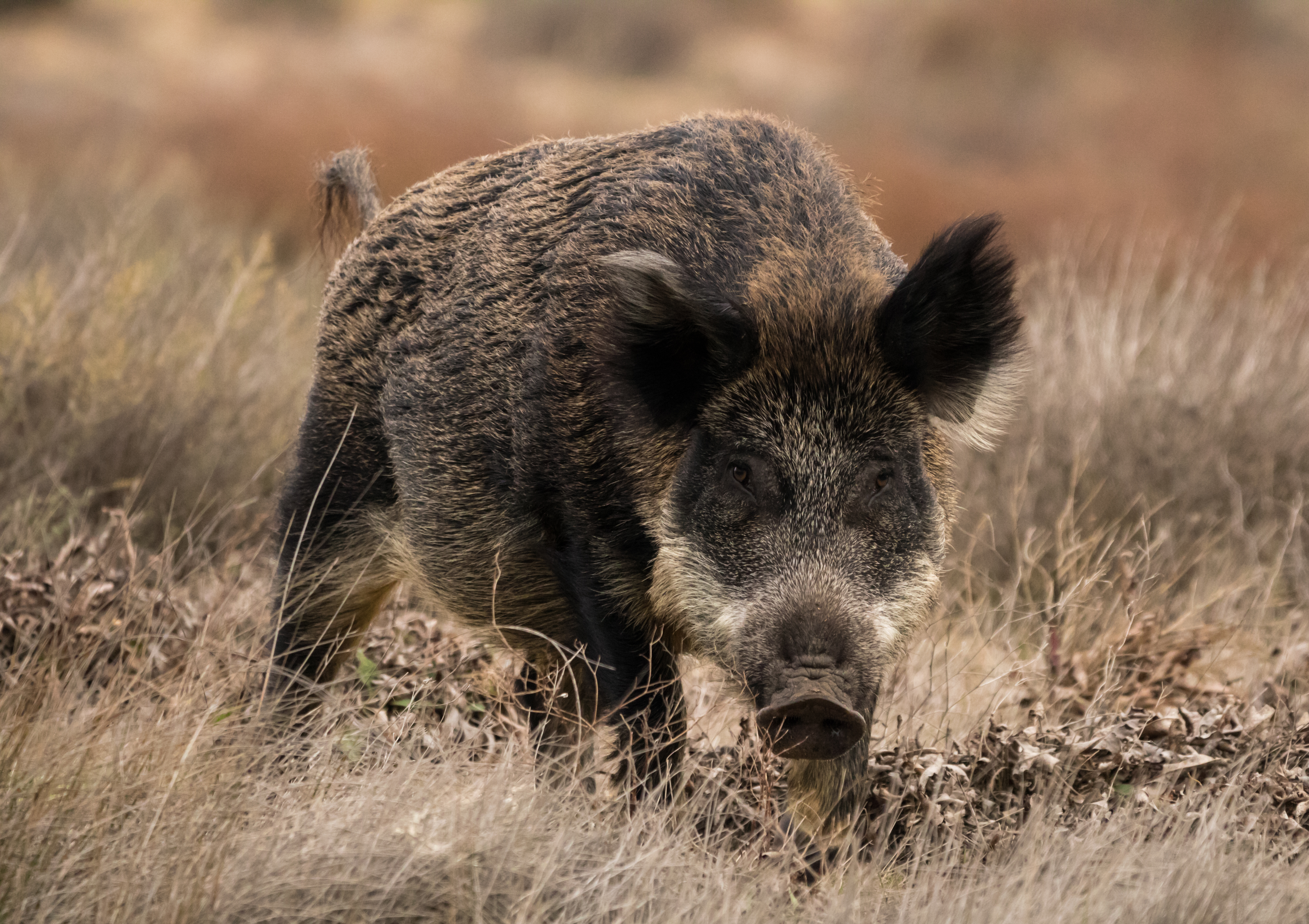
- Wild boar in the park
  In dry area gazelle, jackal, fox, rabbit, badger, in Caspian waters seal and various fishes, birds such as black-headed gull, Pallas's gull, whooper swan, mute swan, mallard, northern shoveler, tufted duck, Eurasian teal, great egret, grey heron, great cormorant, Eurasian coot, Eurasian curlew, dunlin, sandpiper, sanderling, grey plover, common ringed plover, kentish plover, marsh harrier, long-legged buzzard, little owl and other migrant birds have inhabited here.
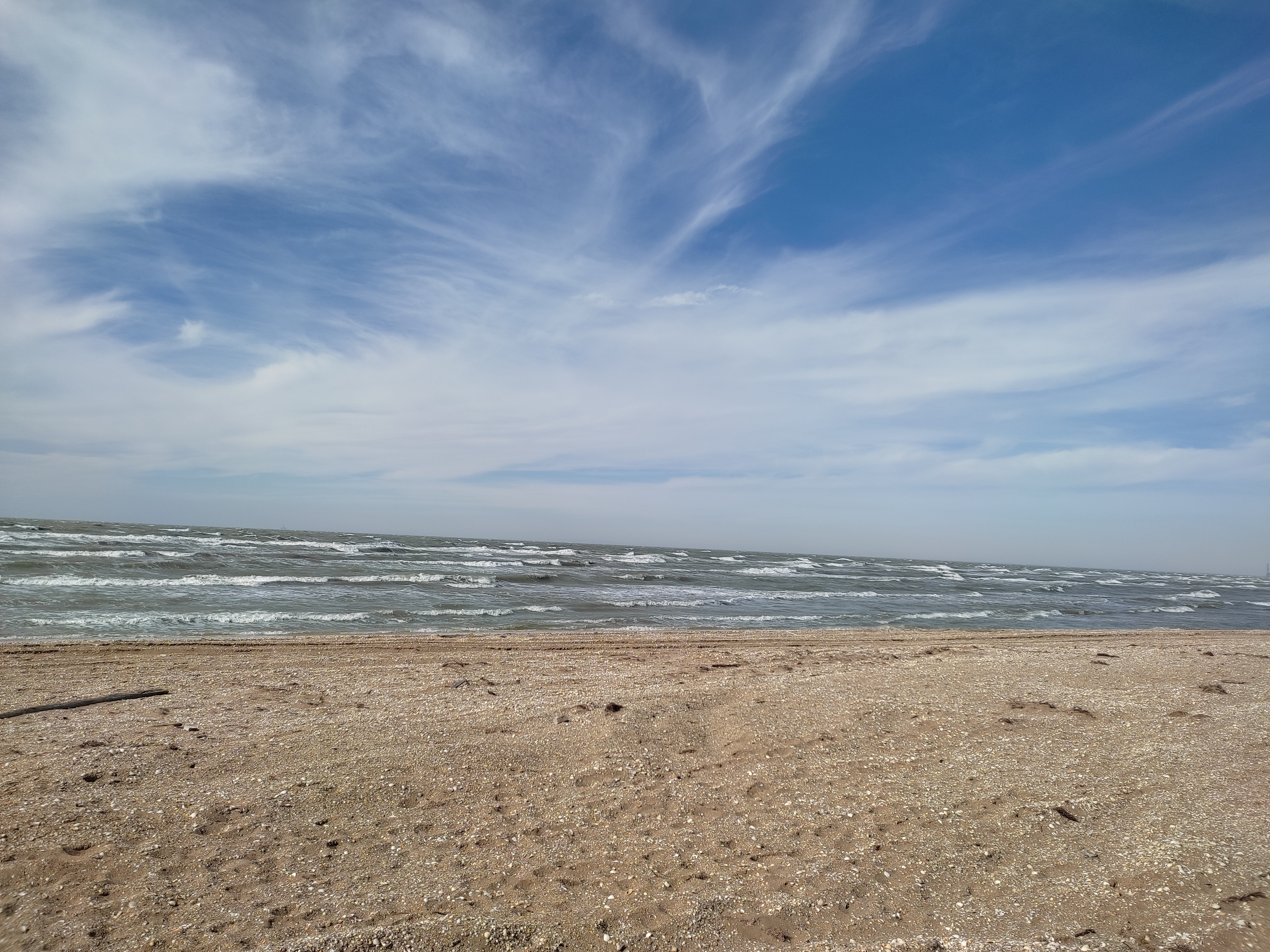
- Caspian Sea, seen from the territory of the park
  The eastern point of the Asiatic lion's range in the Trans-Caucasus was Absheron Peninsula, before the end of the 10th century.
- The Caspian tiger used to invade Apsheron Peninsula from the Talysh Mountains and Lankaran Lowland, before disappearing in the 20th century.
- The Caucasian leopard, lynx, and striped hyena were reported in this area.

== See also ==
- Nature of Azerbaijan
- National Parks of Azerbaijan
- State Reserves of Azerbaijan
- List of protected areas of Azerbaijan
