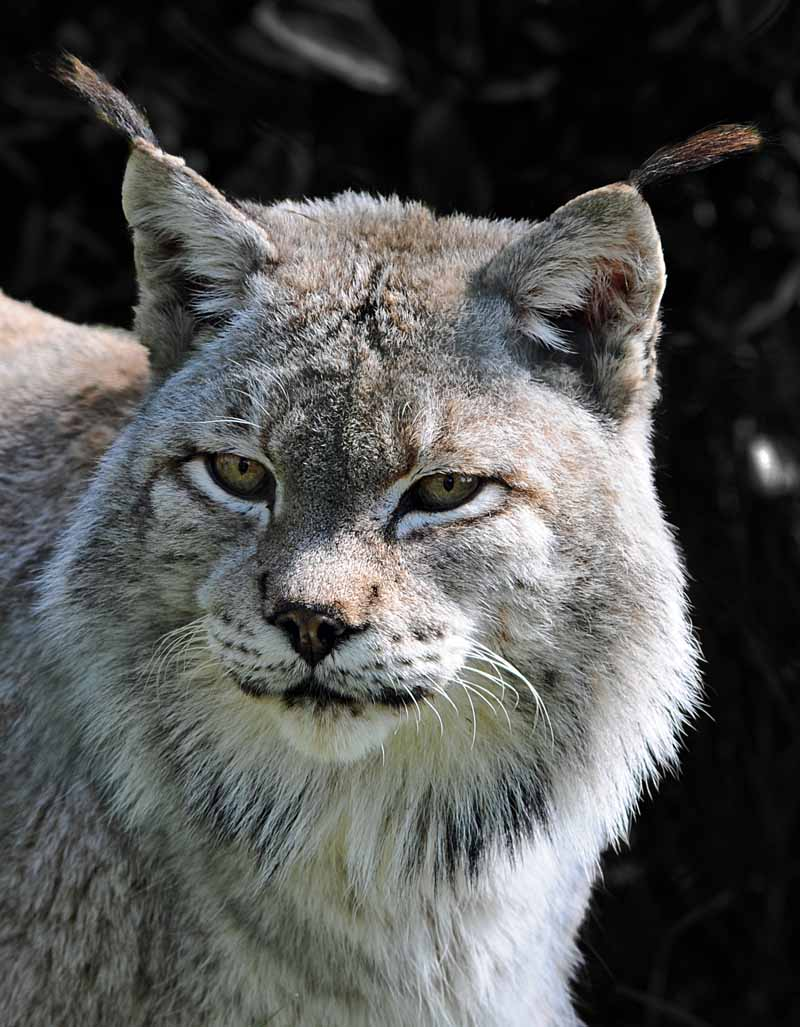
- A Siberian lynx at Dartmoor Zoological Park, England.

Scientific classification
- Kingdom: Animalia
- Phylum: Chordata
- Class: Mammalia
- Infraclass: Placentalia
- Order: Carnivora
- Family: Felidae
- Genus: Lynx
- Species: L. lynx
- Subspecies: L. l. wrangeli

Trinomial name
- Lynx lynx wrangeli (Ognev, 1928)

Synonyms
- Lynx lynx cervaria (Temminck, 1824)

= Siberian lynx =

Subspecies of carnivore

The Siberian lynx (Lynx lynx wrangeli), also known as the East Siberian lynx, is the second most common subspecies of the Eurasian lynx. This cat can be found in the Russian Far East, North Korea, Mongolia, and China (Manchuria and eastern Inner Mongolia), including in the Stanovoy Range and east of the Yenisei River. There were 5,890 mature individuals in the Russian Far East as of 2013. The Siberian lynx is mainly a forager, and its prey includes hares and Siberian roe deer. According to a study done on the mortality of Eurasian lynx, the Siberian lynx lives to an average age of 15 years.

== Genetic and Morphological Studies ==
There are 6 main subspecies of Eurasian lynx (Lynx lynx). Other subspecies have been reported based on their geographic presence, such as Tien Shan and Altai lynx found around at these mountains and separated by the Junggar basin. A study conducted in 2024 had investigated the morphological and genetic differences between these subspecies. It had determined that the morphological differences were gradual and not explicitly distinct, distinguishing them by DNA haplotypes that established that they separately shared haplotypes with one of the well known subspecies; the Tien Shien lynx with the Turkestan lynx, and the Altai lynx with the Siberian lynx.

== Diet ==
The Siberian lynx, like other Eurasian lynx, are a larger lynx species. They primarily hunt small to medium-sized hoofed animals including roe deer, chamois, and musk deer. They are also capable of hunting adult red deer and reindeer up to three to four times their size in some regions. The Siberian lynx will turn to foxes, hares, marmots, and birds when their primary food source is in short supply.

== Reproduction ==
The mating season of the Siberian Lynx is approximately one month long. It starts in February and ends in early April. After gestating for 68 to 73 days, one to four kittens are born between May and June. These kittens will stay with their mothers until the following mating season. This period lasts 10 months.

== See also ==
- Caucasian lynx
