= Altyaghach National Park =

Altyaghach National Park Altıağac Milli Parkı
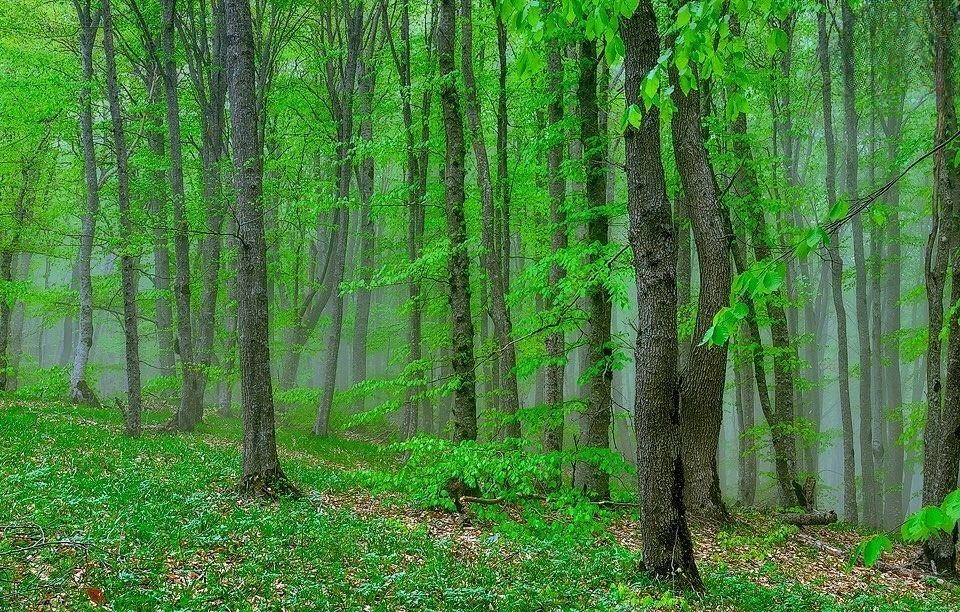
- Temperate deciduous broadleaved forest in Altyaghach National Park

- Location within Azerbaijan
- 40°53′12″N 48°53′37″E
- Location: Xızı Rayon; Siyəzən Rayon

Site notes
- Area: 11,035 hectares (110.35 km^{2})
- Governing body: Republic of Azerbaijan; Ministry of Ecology and Natural Resources

Altyaghach National Park (Azerbaijani: Altıağac Milli Parkı) — is a national park of Azerbaijan. It was established on an area of 11,035 hectares (110.35 km^{2}) in the Khizi Rayon and Siazan Rayon administrative districts on August 31, 2004. It is about 120 km away from the capital Baku.

It was founded with the aim of restoring the rich diversity of flora and fauna in the region. Most of the park is covered with deciduous forests.

== Flora and fauna ==
=== Flora ===
The area of Altyaghach is 90.5% covered by temperate deciduous broadleaved forests. The major types of trees are Persian Ironwood (Parrotia persica), Caucasian Oak (Quercus macranthera), Caucasian Ash (Fraxinus angustifolia subsp. oxycarpa), European Hornbeam (Carpinus betulus), Oriental Hornbeam (Carpinus orientalis), Oriental Beech (Fagus orientalis), Silver Birch (Betula pendula), White Birch (Betula pubescens), etc.

Shrub species occurring in the area include Various-Leaved Hawthorn (Crataegus heterophylla), Dog Rose (Rosa canina), Blackberry (Rubus fruticosus), etc.

=== Fauna ===
The national park is home to the rare East Caucasian tur (Capra cylindricornis), a mountain dwelling goat antelope found only in the eastern half of the Caucasus Mountains. Other large mammals found here are the lynx (Lynx lynx), brown bear (Ursus arctos), wild boar (Sus scrofa), wolf (Canis lupus), golden jackal (Canis aureus), jungle cat (Felis chaus), red fox (Vulpes vulpes), roe deer (Capreolus capreolus), badger (Meles meles), and otter (Lutra lutra), etc.

== See also ==
- Nature of Azerbaijan
- National Parks of Azerbaijan
- State Reserves of Azerbaijan
- List of protected areas of Azerbaijan
