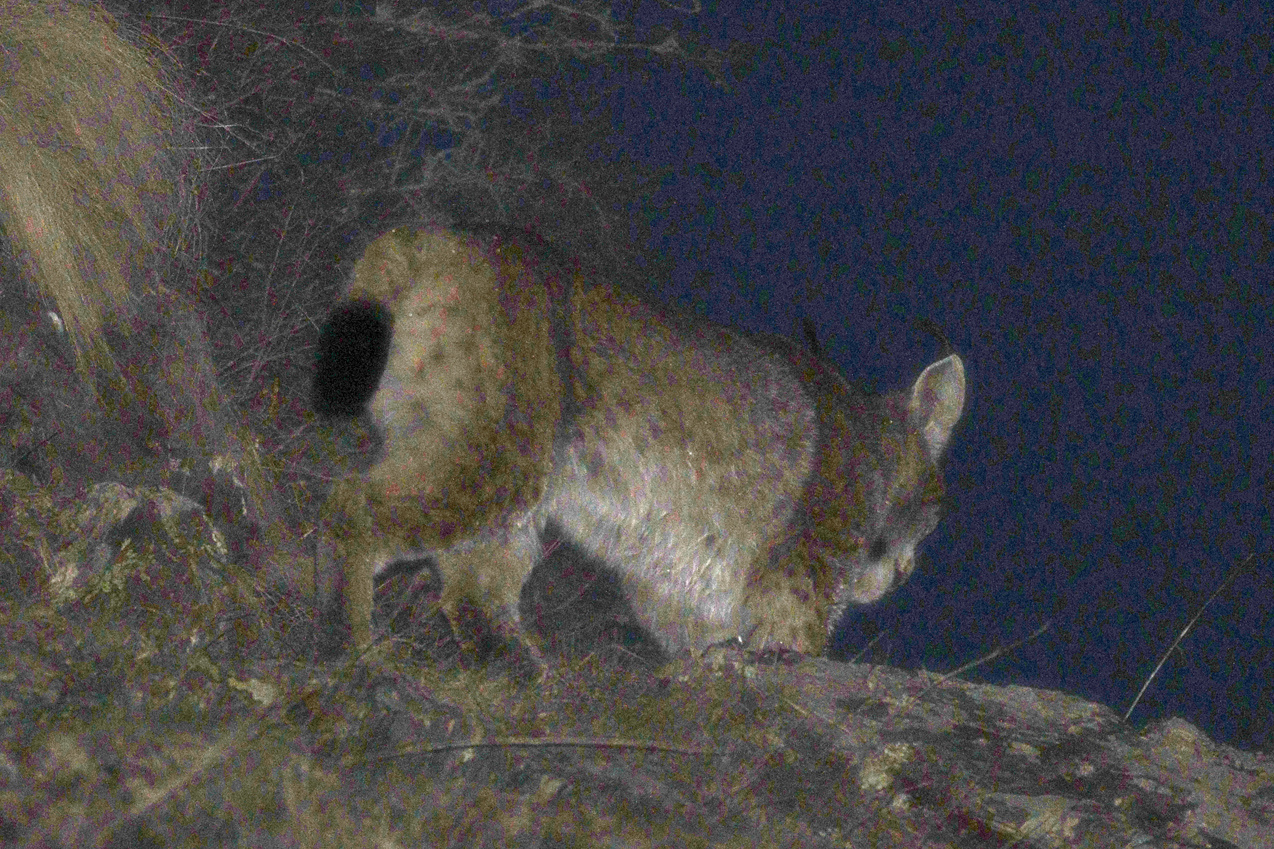

Scientific classification
- Kingdom: Animalia
- Phylum: Chordata
- Class: Mammalia
- Order: Carnivora
- Family: Felidae
- Genus: Lynx
- Species: L. lynx
- Subspecies: L. l. dinniki

Trinomial name
- Lynx lynx dinniki (Satunin, 1915)

Synonyms
- Lynx lynx orientalis (Satunin, 1905)

= Caucasian lynx =

Subspecies of carnivore

The Caucasian lynx (Lynx lynx dinniki), also known as the Caucasus lynx or the eastern lynx, is a subspecies of Eurasian lynx native in the Caucasus, Iran, Turkey, and European Russia.

== Conservation ==
It is proposed for the Caucasian lynx to be listed as Vulnerable in Iran. In Azerbaijan, it is listed as Least Concern, and as Critically Endangered in Georgia. Some work has been done in Armenia to determine a conservation plan. A new breeding population of Caucasian lynx was detected in eastern Turkey, which is facing habitat loss and prey depletion.

== Stamp ==
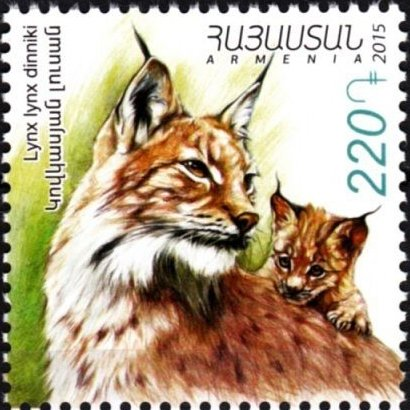
2015 Armenian postage stamp featuring the Caucasian lynx

In 2015, the Caucasian lynx was featured on an Armenian postage stamp.

== See also ==
- Absheron National Park
- Siberian lynx
