= Zangezur National Park =

Zangezur National Park Zəngəzur Milli Parkı
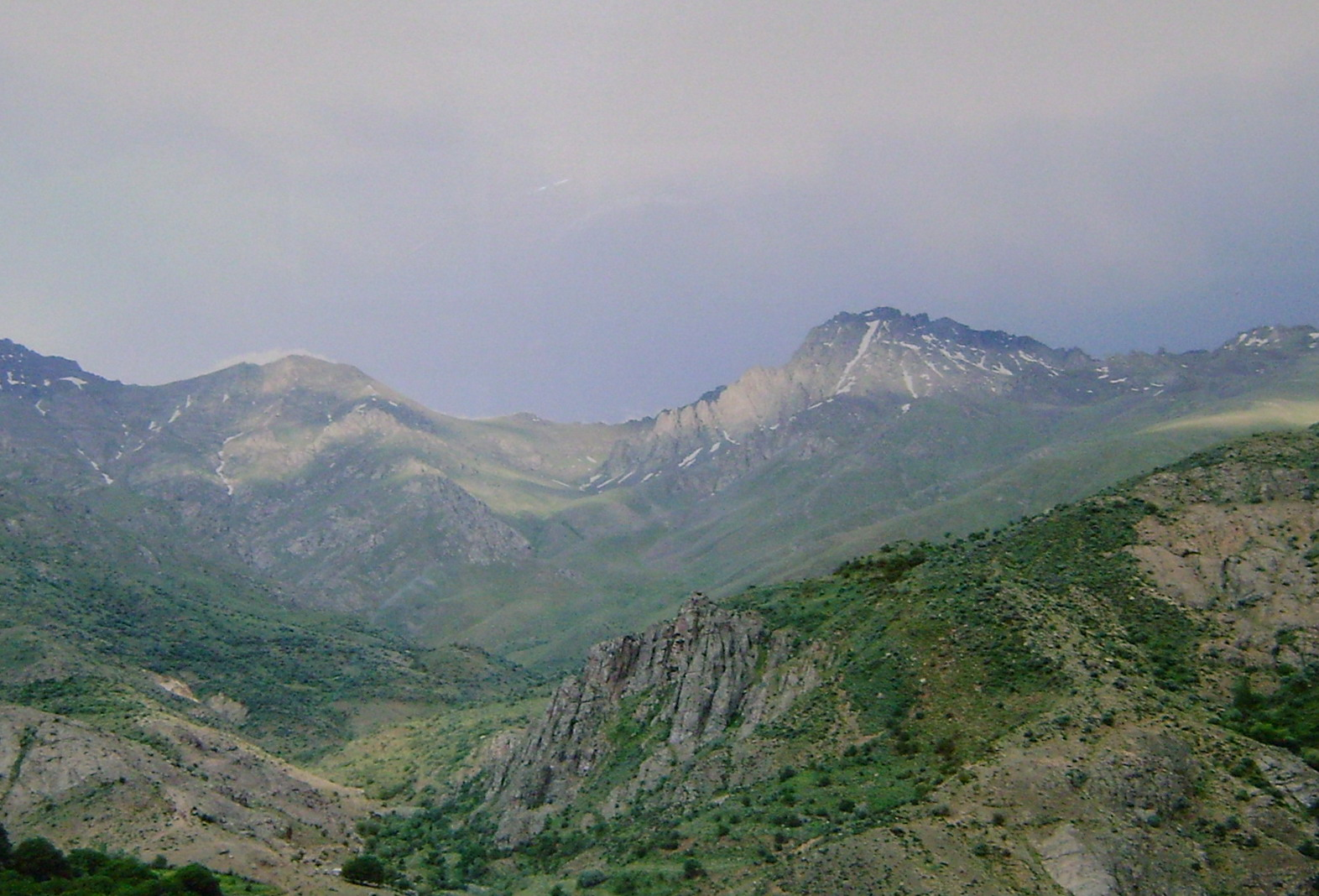

- Location within Azerbaijan
- 39°09′44″N 45°55′47″E
- Location: Ordubad District

Site notes
- Area: 42,797 hectares (427.97 km^{2})
- Governing body: Republic of Azerbaijan; Ministry of Ecology and Natural Resources

Zangezur National Park (Azerbaijani: Zəngəzur Milli Parkı) is a national park in Azerbaijan. It was established as the Ordubad National Park on an area of 12,131 hectares (121.31 km^{2}) in Ordubad District of the Nakhchivan Autonomous Republic on June 16, 2003. On 25 November 2009 it was enlarged to 42,797 hectares (427.97 km^{2}) and renamed Zangezur National Park. This park is located in a mountainous area. It is cold in the winter and hot in the summer. The temperature changes between -30 °C and -10 °C in January and 10 °C 25 °C in July. The annual precipitation is 300–800 mm. The running water comes from the Gilanchay, Vanadchay, Duylunchay, Aylishchay, Ganzachay, Kotamchay, Kilitchay, and Ordubadchay rivers. Rain and melting snow constitute the main parts of these rivers.

== Flora ==
Rare plants such as Iris elegantissima, Himantoglossum formosum, Ferula glabrum and other plants occur in Zangezur National Park. 39 species of plants which grow here are included in the Red Book of Azerbaijan.

== Fauna ==
The Zangezur National Park is characterized by a rich biological diversity. 58 species of animals (35 vertebrates and 23 insects) has been recorded. The National Park have such rare and endangered species as Persian leopard, mouflon, bezoar ibex, white-tailed eagle, golden eagle, and little bustard.

Furthermore, Nakhchivan is known to have 62 mammal species and subspecies. 32 of them such as Blasius's horseshoe bat, southern horseshoe bat, porcupine, manul, bezoar ibex and Caucasian mouflon occur in the Zangezur National Park. Additionally, approximately 12 carnivorous mammals such as leopard, wolf, jackal, fox, striped hyena, badger, wild cat and other predators constitute an important part of the fauna of the park.

In addition to mammals, 217 bird species and subspecies such as Levant Sparrowhawk, great white pelican, Dalmatian pelican, white-tailed eagle, lammergeyer, short-toed eagle, great bustard and little bustard can be found in the region. 15 of those species were added to the Red Book.

According to a 2010 USAID report (which described Azerbaijan's national parks as "so-called national parks"), public access to the Ordubad National Park is all but impossible, since it requires a personal letter "obtained far in advance of a projected visit, and often refused" from the Minister of Azerbaijan's Ministry of Ecology and Natural Resources (MENR), but this is very difficult to obtain for NGOs, international donors, or anyone outside of the government.

In addition to the rich flora and fauna of the Zangezur National Park is rich with natural and historical monuments.

== See also ==
- Nature of Azerbaijan
- National Parks of Azerbaijan
- State Reserves of Azerbaijan
- List of protected areas of Azerbaijan
