= National parks of Azerbaijan =

National parks of Azerbaijan are run by the Ministry of Ecology and Natural Resources in the Republic of Azerbaijan. The first national park established was Zangezur National Park in 2003. Since then, a further 9 national parks have been established; the most recent being the Gizilaghaj National Park in 2018.

The national parks are the public lands or bodies of water of special environmental, historical and other importance, which bear the status of governmental protection. They serve to the purposes of environmental protection, educational, scientific, cultural researches, etc.

== National parks ==
As a country located in the Caucasus between the Black and Caspian Seas, Azerbaijan has a rich flora and fauna and widest biodiversity among the European states and enormous natural resources. The lands with specially protected ecosystems play a crucial role in biodiversity preservation. The activity of such natural bodies promotes the preservation of rare and endangered species of plants and animals. Azerbaijan has a total of 10 national parks (as well as 13 state natural parks and 21 state reserves), which are listed in the table with the year of their establishment and their surface area. In the first three months of 2024, the number of visitors to Azerbaijan's national parks increased 35.3% compared to the same period a year ago, according to the State Tourism Agency.

National Park	Date of establishment	Surface area (ha)	Surface area (km2)	Surface area (square miles)	Map
Zangezur National Park	June 16, 2003 (expanded on November 23, 2009)	42,797	427.97	165.24	National parks of Azerbaijan is located in Azerbaijan
Ag-Gel National Park	July 5, 2003	17,924	179.24	69.20	National parks of Azerbaijan is located in Azerbaijan
Shirvan National Park	July 5, 2003	54,373.5	543.735	209.937	National parks of Azerbaijan is located in Azerbaijan
Hirkan National Park	February 9, 2004 (enlarged on April 23, 2008)	40,358	403.58	155.82	National parks of Azerbaijan is located in Azerbaijan
Altyaghach National Park	August 31, 2004	11,035	110.35	42.61	National parks of Azerbaijan is located in Azerbaijan
Absheron National Park	February 8, 2005	783	7.83	3.02	National parks of Azerbaijan is located in Azerbaijan
Shahdag National Park	December 8, 2006 (enlarged on July 5, 2010)	115,900	1,159	447	National parks of Azerbaijan is located in Azerbaijan
Göygöl National Park	April 1, 2008	12,755	127.55	49.25	National parks of Azerbaijan is located in Azerbaijan
Samur-Yalama National Park	November 5, 2012	11,772	117.72	45.45	National parks of Azerbaijan is located in Azerbaijan
Gizilaghaj National Park	September 26, 2018	99,060.0	990.600	382.473	National parks of Azerbaijan is located in Azerbaijan

The total surface area of the 10 national parks is 421,366.4 hectares (4,213.664 km^{2}; 1,626.905 sq mi). In total more than 4.9% of Azerbaijan is under protection by the government as national parks.

=== Zangezur National Park ===
The Zangezur National Park (it was renamed and expanded in 2009 from former Ordubad National Park) is characterized by rich biological diversity. It has 58 species of animals (35 of vertebrates and 23 of insects) and 39 species of plants which are included into the Red Book of Azerbaijan. The National Park comprises such rare and endangered species as Persian leopard, mouflon, bezoar ibex, white-tailed eagle, golden eagle, little bustard.

=== Shirvan National Park ===
The Shirvan National Park has a semidesert landscape and water body of approximately 40 square kilometres. The national park has an extremely rich ornithological fauna. Rare and valuable species of birds (turaj, little bustard, bustard, swans, flamingo, etc.) winter and nest in the marshy areas. Djeyran gazelles are the most widely spread mammals in the region.

=== Ag-Gol National Park ===
Ag-Gol National Park is located in the Mil plain of the Kur-Araz lowlands, it has semidesert landscape and deserved the title of a bird paradise, as the most important winter and nest place of birds. The ornithological fauna of this reserve is very rich. Over 140 species of birds are found in this place including 89 species of nesting birds (Partridge, spoonbill, swan, teal, bustard, etc.). Ag-Gol national park is designed to protect the marshy ecological systems, as the nesting and wintering places of migratory and waterbirds. Ag-Gol has been incorporated into the list of UNESCO's convention "On internationally important marshy areas as the residing places of birds".

=== Hirkan National Park ===
Hirkan National Park is located in the Lenkoran Lowland and the Talysh Mountains, and is 99% covered by forests in a primarily mountainous region, and is strictly protected.

Hirkan National Park preserves relict and endemic plants species of Tertiary period. Forests of Hirkan account for 150 out of 435 types of trees and bushes. One can come across such types of trees, included into the Red Book of Azerbaijan as, Hirkan box tree, iron tree, chestnut leaved oak, fig-tree, Hirkan pear-tree, Silk Acacia, Caucasus palm-tree, Caspian gleditsia, butcher's broom, alder-tree, such animals as the Persian leopard, the Talysh pheasant, golden eagle, etc.

=== Altyaghach National Park ===
The area of Altyaghach is 90.5% covered by temperate deciduous broadleaved forests. The major types of trees are iron trees, Caucasus hornbeam, Oriental beech, cud, birch-tree, etc. The national park is home to the rare East Caucasian tur (Capra cylindricornis), a mountain dwelling goat antelope found only in the eastern half of the Caucasus Mountains. Animals as the roe deer, bear, wild boar, lynx, fox, rabbit, squirrel, wolf, etc. are found on the territory of this park.

=== Absheron National Park ===
The predecessor of Absheron National Park during Soviet times was the Absheron State Nature Preserve which was created in July 1969 in order to protect gazelle, Caspian seal and water birds inhabited in the territory. The climate of the area is mild-hot, specific to semi-desert and dry steppe. Types and phytomass of flora is too poor here, plants are changed respective of the water and saltiness regime of area. Sea coastal sand plants (42.6%), meadows with jigilgamish and paz grass (13.2%), one-year saline grasses (5.2%) etc. are spread. Ephemeras also develop well in early spring. In dry area gazelle, jackal, fox, rabbit, badger, in Caspian waters seal and various fishes, birds such as silver gull, wheezing swan, grey and red-headed black, white-eyed black ducks, big white bittern, sandpiper, bald-coot, marsh belibagli, sea bozcha and other migrant birds have inhabited here. Animals and birds inhabiting in Shirvan National Park, names of which have been included in the Red Books, exist in Absheron National Park as well.

=== Shahdag National Park ===
The Shakhdag National Park was created in 2006, and became the largest national park not only Azerbaijan but in the whole Caucasus.

The Shahdag National Park is located in northern Azerbaijan, on the border with Russia and Georgia at the Greater Caucasus Mountains. The World Bank has allocated a $17 million loan and $8 million grant for the national park's creation, while the government of Japan has provided $8 million as a grant for the project implementation. Shahdag National Park will help address ecological issues and build a tourist infrastructure in the Caucasus for visitors .

=== Göygöl National Park ===
The Göygöl National Park was created in 2008. The predecessor of Göygöl National Park during Soviet times was the "Goy Gol State Reserve" that was established in 1925. The Göygöl National Park is located in eastern Azerbaijan, on the northern slopes of the Lesser Caucasus and includes Lake Göygöl after which it is named. The area of Göygöl is almost entirely covered by forests and has a rich flora with over 420 plant species, including 20 which are endemic to the area. It also has a rich fauna, with mammals such as brown bears, Caucasian red deer, roe deer, lynx, etc. and birds such as the lammergeyer, raven, mountain partridge.

=== Samur-Yalama National Park ===
The Samur-Yalama National Park was created in 2012. The major part of the national park is in the Caspian coastal zone and is covered with forests. The types of habitats include the littoral zone, forest, bush and steppe. Some characteristic species are black kite, eastern imperial eagle, otter, reed cat, lynx, chamois, Caspian red deer and brown bear. In the coastal waters belonging to the national park, stellate sturgeon, brown trout, eel, pikeperch and Caspian kutum can be found.

=== Gizilaghaj National Park ===
The Gizilaghaj National Park was created in 2018 and is currently the newest national park of Azerbaijan.

== Geographic location ==
National Parks of Azerbaijan (8)

== See also ==
- Nature of Azerbaijan
- State Reserves of Azerbaijan
- List of protected areas of Azerbaijan
- Ministry of Ecology and Natural Resources
