= List of protected areas of Azerbaijan =

This is a list of protected areas of Azerbaijan, including both national parks and state reserves:

== Parks ==
Parks
Absheron National Park
Ag-Gol National Park
Altyaghach National Park
Göygöl National Park
Hirkan National Park
Zangezur National Park
Baku Zoo
Shahdag National Park
Samur-Yalama National Park
Shirvan National Park
Hirkan National Park

== Reserves ==
State Reserves
Basut-Chay State Reserve
Eldar Pine State Reserve
Gara-Yaz State Reserve
Gizil-Agach State Reserve
Gobustan State Reserve
Ilisu State Reserve
Ismailli State Reserve
Pirgulu State Reserve
Shahbuz State Reserve
Shirvan State Reserve
Shusha State Historical and Architectural Reserve
Turian-Chay State Reserve
Qaragol State Reserve
Zagatala State Reserve
Turyanchay State Reserve

- Ag-Gel Nature Sanctuary or Partial Reserve
- Ag-Gelskiy State Reserve
- Alty-Agachskiy State Reserve
- Apsheron Nature Sanctuary or Partial Reserve
- Arazboyu Nature Sanctuary or Partial Reserve
- Barda Nature Sanctuary or Partial Reserve
- Byandovan Nature Sanctuary or Partial Reserve
- Dashalti Nature Sanctuary or Partial Reserve
- Eller Oyugu State Nature Reserve
- Gabala Nature Sanctuary or Partial Reserve
- Garayazi State Reserve
- Gil Adasi Nature Sanctuary or Partial Reserve
- Gizildja Nature Sanctuary or Partial Reserve
- Ismayilli Nature Sanctuary or Partial Reserve
- Karagel State Reserve
- Karayaz-Akstafa Nature Sanctuary or Partial Reserve
- Kichik Kizil Agach Nature Sanctuary or Partial Reserve
- Korchay Nature Sanctuary or Partial Reserve
- Kubatli Nature Sanctuary or Partial Reserve
- Lachin Nature Sanctuary or Partial Reserve
- Pirkulinskiy State Reserve
- Qusar Nature Sanctuary or Partial Reserve
- Shamkir Nature Sanctuary or Partial Reserve
- Sheki Nature Sanctuary or Partial Reserve
- Shirvannskiy State Reserve
- Zangezur Nature Sanctuary or Partial Reserve
- Zuvandinskiy Nature Sanctuary or Partial Reserve

== See also ==
- National Parks of Azerbaijan
- State Reserves of Azerbaijan
