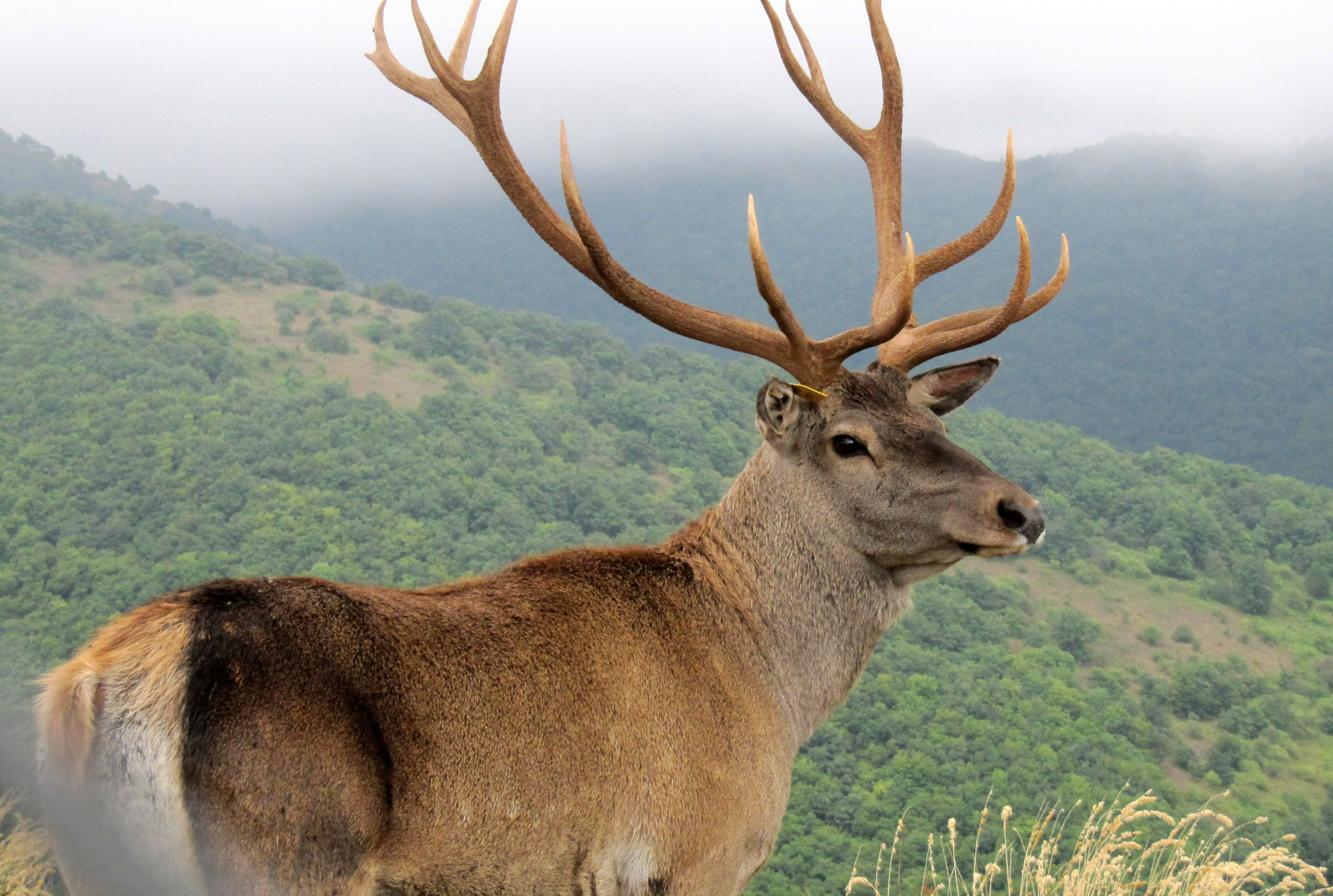

Conservation status
- Endangered (IUCN 3.1)

Scientific classification
- Kingdom: Animalia
- Phylum: Chordata
- Class: Mammalia
- Order: Artiodactyla
- Family: Cervidae
- Genus: Cervus
- Species: C. elaphus
- Subspecies: C. e. maral

Trinomial name
- Cervus elaphus maral (Gray, 1850)

= Caspian red deer =

Subspecies of deer

The Caspian red deer (Cervus elaphus maral), is one of the easternmost subspecies of red deer that is native to areas between the Black Sea and Caspian Sea such as Crimea, Asia Minor, the Caucasus Mountains region bordering Europe and Asia, and along the Caspian Sea region in Iran. The Caspian red deer is sometimes referred to as maral, noble deer, or eastern red deer.

== Classification ==
The Caspian red deer is a subspecies of the red deer.

== Description ==
The Caspian red deer is around 4 feet 6 inches (1.37 m) tall, and can weigh 500 to 700 pounds (230 to 320 kg). Their antlers are around 4 feet (1.2 m) in length, and 6 inches (150 mm) in girth. Its coat is dark gray, except in the summer, when it is a dark brown. They shed their antlers in late winter and their new antlers reach full growth in late summer. One, occasionally two, fawns are born in mid-spring. The fawns are reddish brown with white spots.

== Ecology and behaviour ==
The Caspian red deer is a social and primarily nocturnal animal. It eats a variety of grasses and leaves and occasionally berries and mushrooms.

== Domestication ==
The Caspian red deer has been domesticated in the 2nd century.

== Threats ==
Within Russia, the Caspian red deer has been hunted for velvet antlers since the 1930s. Historically, demand for velvet antlers from Asia was met by organized deer farms in the Soviet Union. Hunting by humans have been noted as the cause for decreases in population. The approximate number of Caspian red deer in eastern Georgia dropped from 2,500 in 1985 to 880 in 1994. Their primary predators include Caucasian leopards and, to a lesser extent, wolves and brown bears. In the past they were also hunted by the now-extinct Caspian tiger.
