= Ministry of Ecology and Natural Resources (Azerbaijan) =

Government ministry of Azerbaijan

Ministry of Ecology and Natural Resources of Azerbaijan Republic
- Azərbaycan Respublikasının Ekologiya və Təbii Sərvətlər Nazirliyi

Agency overview
- Formed: May 23, 2001
- Jurisdiction: Government of Azerbaijan
- Headquarters: K.Kazimzade Str, 100 A, Baku, Azerbaijan Republic AZ1000
- Agency executives: Mukhtar Babayev, Minister of Ecology and Natural Resources; Rauf Hajiyev, Deputy Minister; Vugar Karimov, Deputy Minister; Umayra Taghiyeva, Deputy Minister
- Website: www.eco.gov.az/en/

The Ministry of Ecology and Natural Resources of Azerbaijan Republic (Azerbaijani: Azərbaycan Respublikasının Ekologiya və Təbii Sərvətlər Nazirliyi) is a governmental agency within the Cabinet of Azerbaijan in charge of regulation of the activities relating to Azerbaijan's ecology, environmental protection and use of natural resources .

== History ==
The Ministry of Ecology and Natural Resources of Azerbaijan was established on May 23, 2001, as per the Presidential Decree of President Heydar Aliyev No. 485, in accordance with structural reforms within the Azerbaijani government. The current activities of the ministry were being implemented, at times duplicated by several governmental agencies such as State Observation Committee for Ecology and Use of Natural Resources, Azermeshe union (responsible for forestry), the State Committee of Geology and Mineral Resources, Azerbaliq State Concern (in charge of fishing industry), State Hydrometeorology Committee and their regulations were decentralized. The decree abolished all these agencies and centralized the governmental regulations and activities by replacing them with the new ministry.

According to Decree №548, signed by President Heydar Aliyev on September 18, 2001, a "statute" linked with the Ministry of Ecology and Natural Resources was approved.

Each year, on May 23, the staff of the ministry celebrates their professional holiday. This day was declared as a non-working day for the staff due to a decree signed by Ilham Aliyev and dates back to May 16, 2007.

== Structure ==
1. The apparatus of the Ministry of Ecology and Natural Resources of the Republic of Azerbaijan (departments and sectors).
2. Department of Environmental Protection.
3. Department of Forestry Development.
4. National Department of Environmental Monitoring.
5. Department for the Conservation and Protection of Biodiversity in Waters.
6. Department for Biodiversity Conservation and Development of Specially Protected Areas.
7. National Hydrometeorological Department.
8. Baku City Department of Ecology and Natural Resources.
9. State Expert Department.
10. Department of the Caspian Integrated Environmental Monitoring.
11. Regional bodies and local departments of the Ministry of Ecology and Natural Resources of the Republic of Azerbaijan.

== See also ==
- Cabinet of Azerbaijan
- National Parks of Azerbaijan
- State Reserves of Azerbaijan
- List of protected areas of Azerbaijan
