= Shahdag =

Shahdag may refer to:

- Shahdag Qusar FK
- Shahdag Mountain Resort
- Shahdag Mountain
- Shahdag National Park
- Shahdagh people
- Şahdağ, or Shahdagh, Azerbaijan
