= Mountains of Azerbaijan =

Coordinates: 41°13′28″N 47°51′30″E

Mountains of Azerbaijan cover approximately 60 percent of the country's land area. There are three mountain ranges in the territory of Azerbaijan, which are the Greater Caucasus, the Lesser Caucasus, and the Talysh Mountains.

The elevation of the central mountains of these three mountain ranges is approximately 1000–2000 meters. The height of high mountains of the Greater Caucasus is higher than 2200 meters and the Lesser Caucasus is higher than 2000 meters.

Mountain ranges in Azerbaijan
Mountain ranges	Area coverage (%)	Zones
Greater Caucasus	30	Foothill (lower than 500 meters)
Greater Caucasus	30	Low mountains (500 – 1200 meters)
Greater Caucasus	30	Middle mountain (1200 – 2200 meters)
Greater Caucasus	30	High mountains (higher than 2200 meters)
Lesser Caucasus	22	Foothill (lower than 500 meters)
Lesser Caucasus	22	Low mountains (500 – 1200 meters)
Lesser Caucasus	22	Middle mountain (1200 – 2000 meters)
Lesser Caucasus	22	High mountains (higher than 2000 meters)
Talysh Mountains	6	Pre – mountain plains (lower than 600 meters)
Talysh Mountains	6	Low mountains (600 – 1000 meters)
Talysh Mountains	6	Middle mountain (1000 – 2500 meters)

The Greater Caucasus range forms the north-east borders of Azerbaijan with Dagestan Autonomous Republic of Russia. Bazarduzu, Shahdagh, and Tufandag are the high peaks of the mountain range. The highest peak of the Greater Caucasus is Mount Bazarduzu, which is situated 14,652 feet (4,466 meters) above the sea level, is also the highest point in Azerbaijan. The mountains of the Greater Caucasus are located in the region of high degree of seismic activity. The mountains are formed by rocks that date back to Jurassic and Cretaceous periods.

The Lesser Caucasus is the second important mountain range in Azerbaijan and forms its south-western borders. Mount Murovdag and Mount Zangezur are the main ridges of the Lesser Caucasus. They are formed by sedimentary and volcanogenic rocks of Cretaceous and Jurassic periods.

The Talysh Mountains cover the southeastern part of Azerbaijan and form part of its border with Iran.

== Mountains of the Greater Caucasus ==
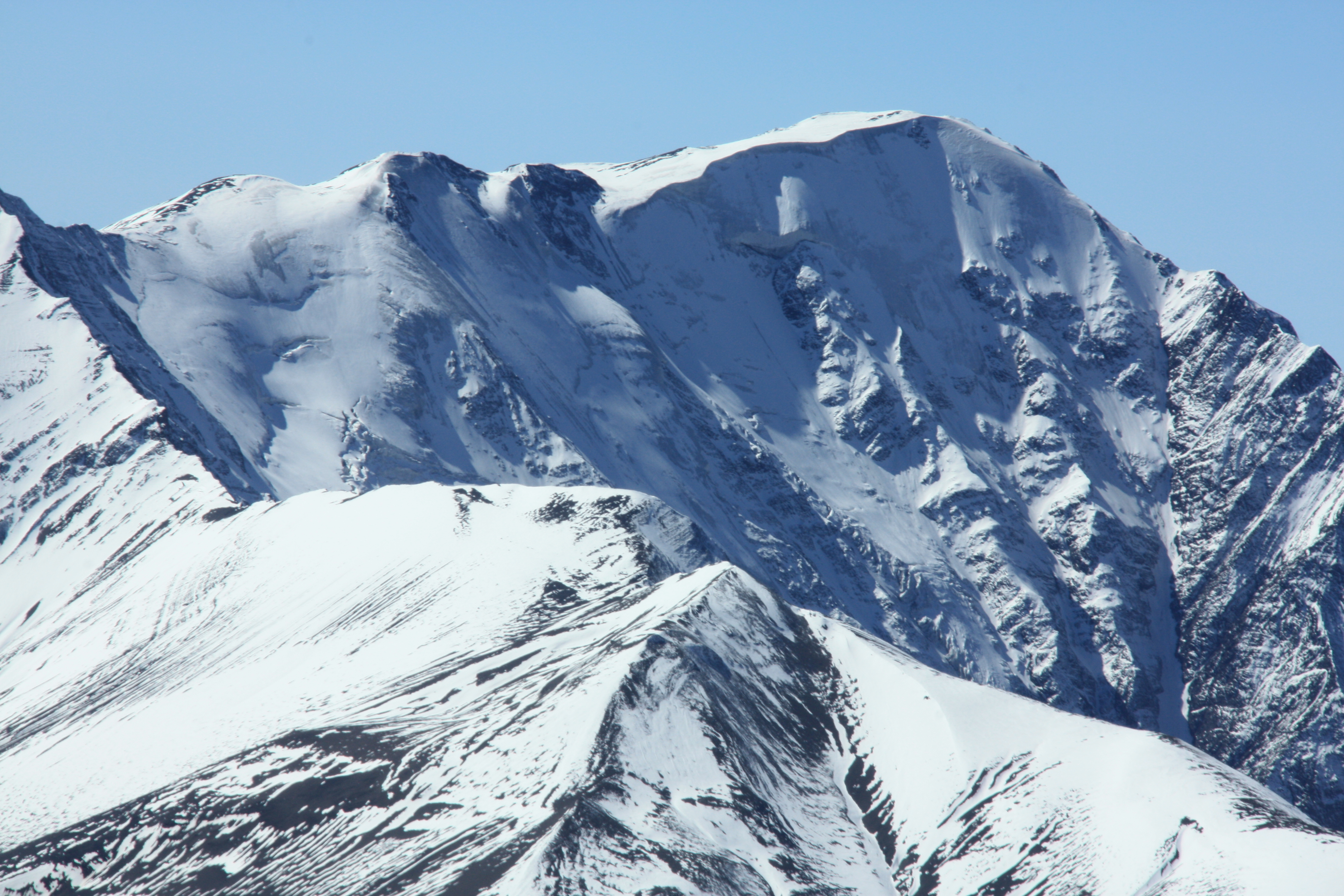
Bazarduzu (Azerbaijani Bazardüzü) - is the highest mountain in Azerbaijan (4466 m)

=== Bazarduzu ===
The highest peak of the Greater Caucasus, Mount Bazarduzu, is the highest mountain in Azerbaijan. It lies on the borders between Azerbaijan and Russia. The rocks of Mount Bazarduzu are formed of shale porphyries. Ice fields that consist of glaciers from Ice Age on the mountain are the biggest glaciers in the Eastern Caucasus.

The first person who climbed the Mount Bazarduzu was Aleksej Aleksandrov from Russia in 1847.

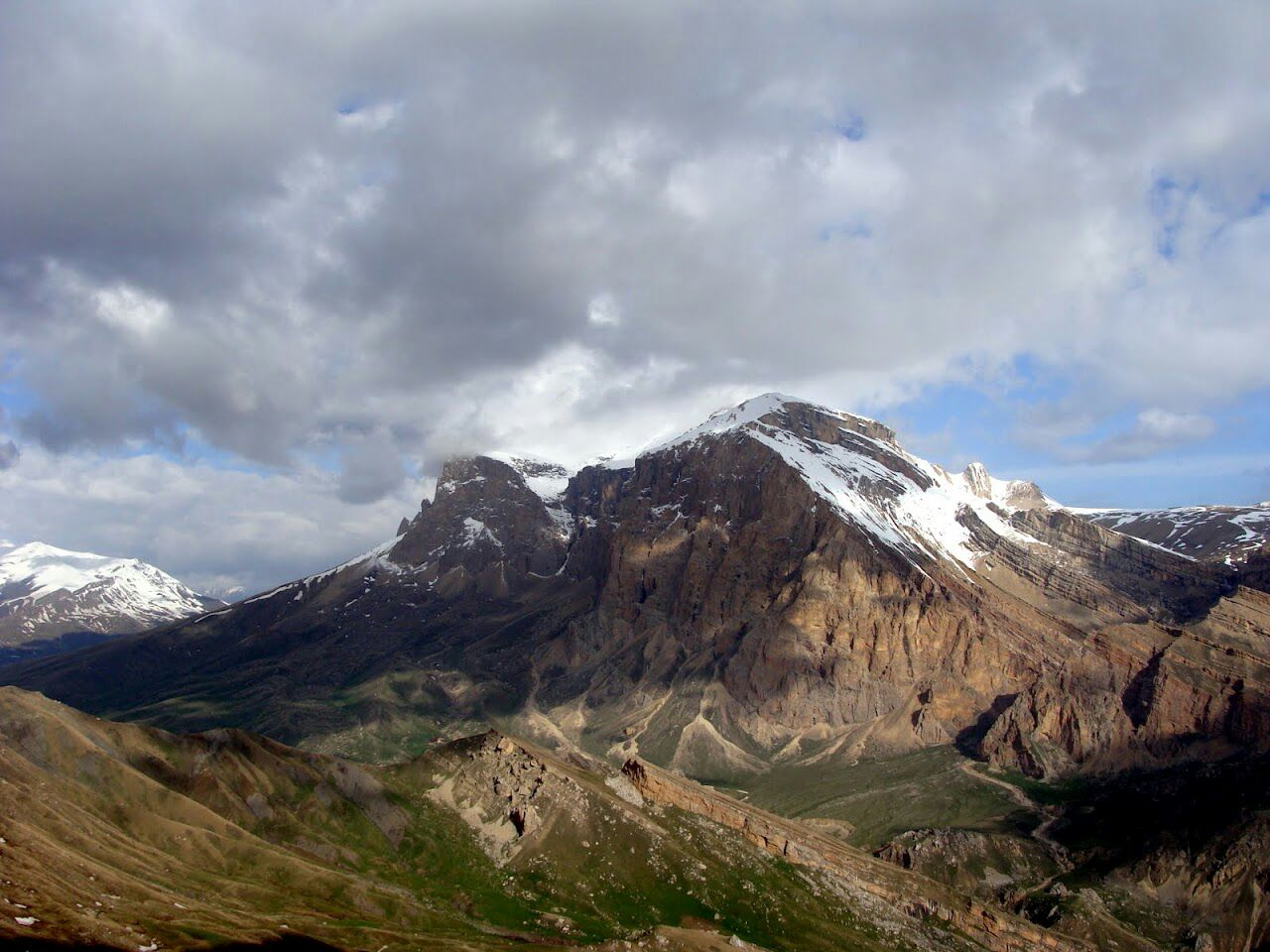
Mount Shahdagh

=== Shahdagh ===
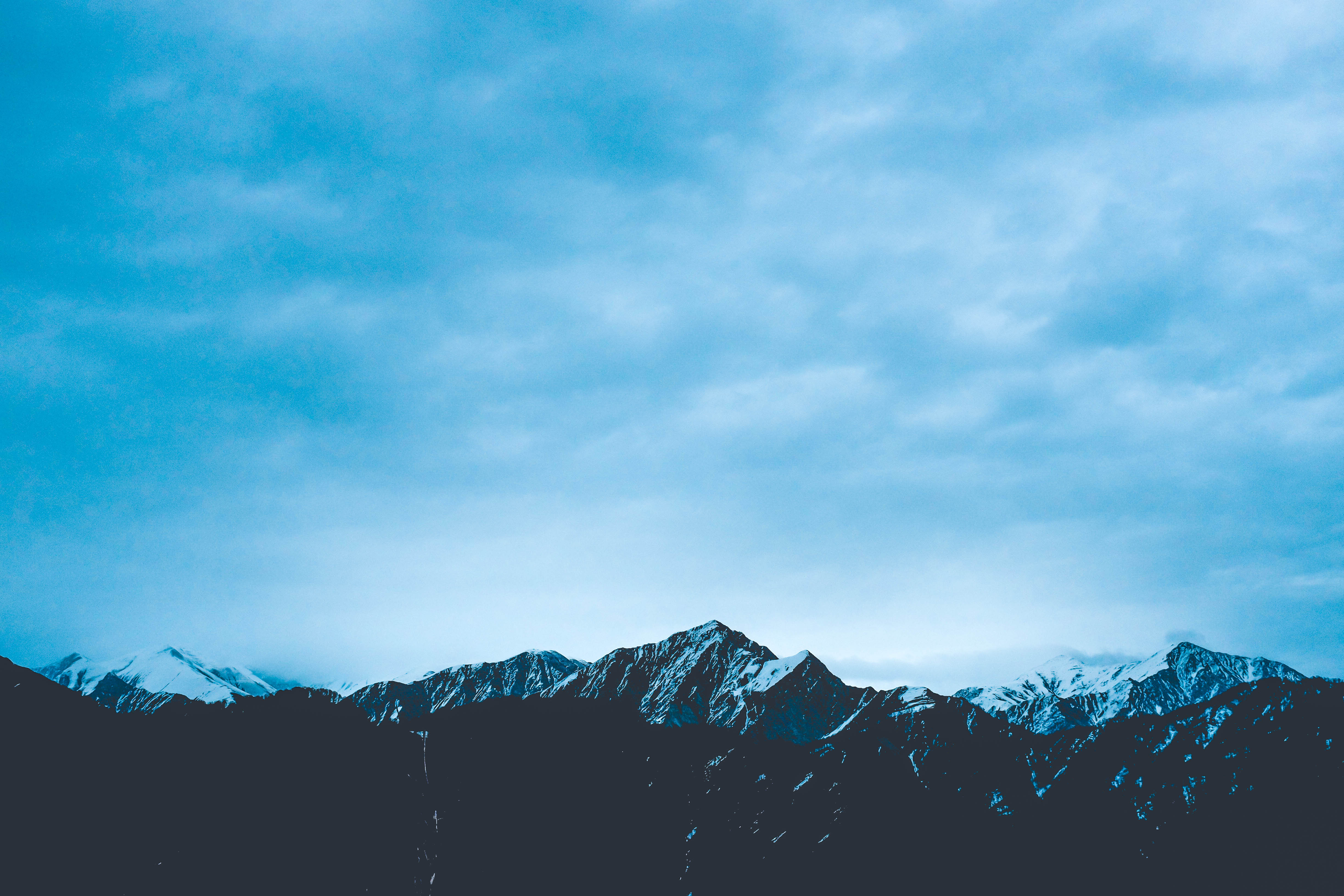
Mount Tufandag

The elevation of Mount Shahdagh is 13,951 feet (4,252 m), which is the second highest peak in the Greater Caucasus. The mountain is located near to the border with Russia, in Gusar region of Azerbaijan. There are caves at the base of the Mount Shahdagh, which show manmade activities around the mountain for over 9000 years. The rocks of the mountain are formed by dolomites and limestones.

=== Tufandag ===
Tufandağ is the third highest mountain in Azerbaijan with the height of 13,770 feet (4,200 m).). Mount Tufandag lies in the Gusar region.

List of mountains of the Greater Caucasus
Name	Original name	Elevation (m)	Region
Bazarduzu	Bazardüzü	4466	Russian – Gusar border
Shahdagh	Şahdağ	4243	Gusar
Tufandag	Tufandağ	4191	Gusar
Bazaryurd	Bazaryurd	4126	Gusar and Gabala
Yarudag	Yarıdağ	4116	Gusar
Chingiz Mustafayev	Çingiz Mustafayev	4062	Guba
Ilham Peak	İlham zirvəsi	4042	Gusar
Heydar Peak	Heydər zirvəsi	3751	Gusar
Khinalig	Xınalıq	3713	Guba
Ragdan	Raqdan	4020	Gabala
Babadag	Babadağ	3629	Ismayilli
Atatürk	Atatürk	3759	Guba
Olympia Peak	Olimpiya zirvəsi	3455	Gusar
Ateshgah	Atəşgah	2151	Guba
Gizil Gaya	Qızıl Qaya	3726	Guba

== Mountains of Lesser Caucasus ==
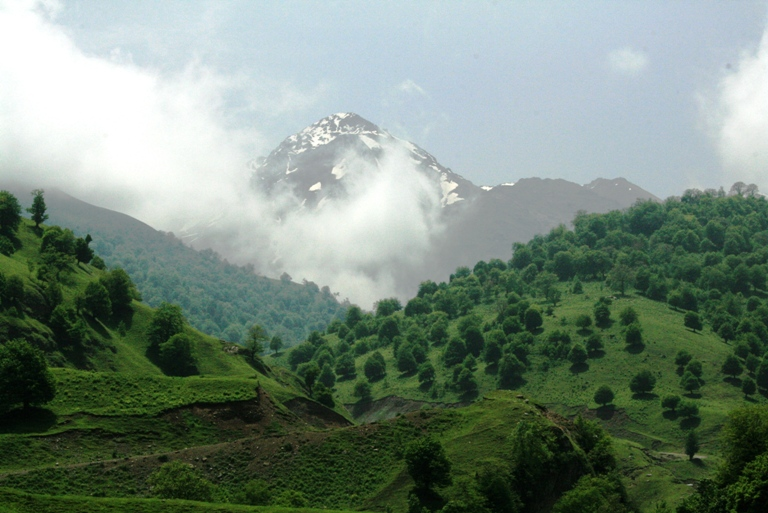
Murovdag (Azerbaijani: Murovdağ)

=== Murovdag ===
Within the Lesser Caucasus, the highest mountain ridge is Murovdag. The range of the mountain is approximately 70 kilometers.

==== Gamishdag ====
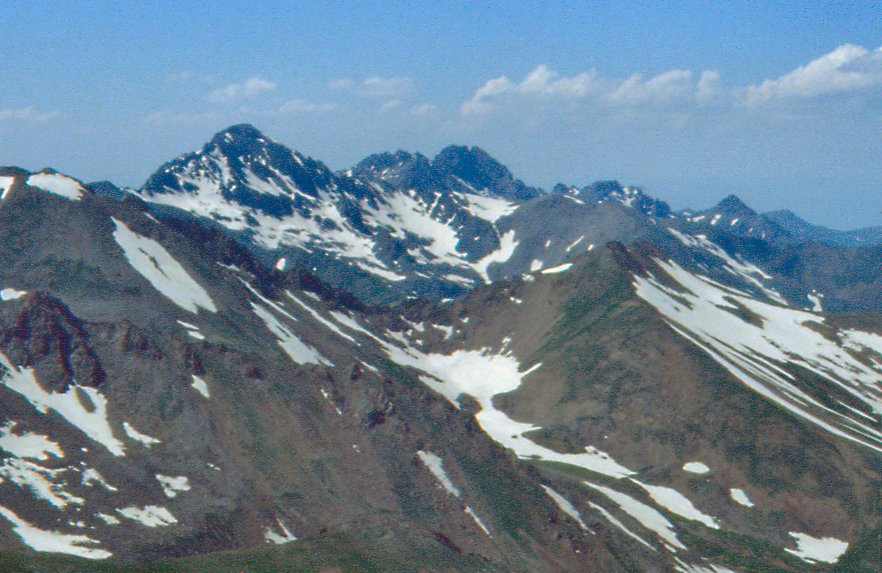
Mount Kaputjukh

The highest peak of the Murovdag ridge is Gamishdag and its elevation is 3724 meters.

=== Zangezur ===
The Zangezur mountain ridge bordered with Aghdaban peak in north-west and Araz river in south-east. The range of the Zangezur ridge is approximately 130 kilometers. In the center and south-east parts of the ridge, there are Gamigaya, Kaputjukh, Garangush, Davabouynu, Aychingil peaks. Prominent mountains of the Zangezur ridge are Nahajir, Alinja, Ilandag, Gurddag, and Gizilboghaz mountains.

==== Kaputjukh ====
Mount Kaputjukh is the highest peak of the Zangezur ridge and the highest mountain in the Lesser Caucasus. The height of the mountain is 3904 meters. It lies in Ordubad region of Nakhchivan. There are ancient Gamigaya inscriptions on the rocks that are at the bottom of the mountain.

=== Alinja ===
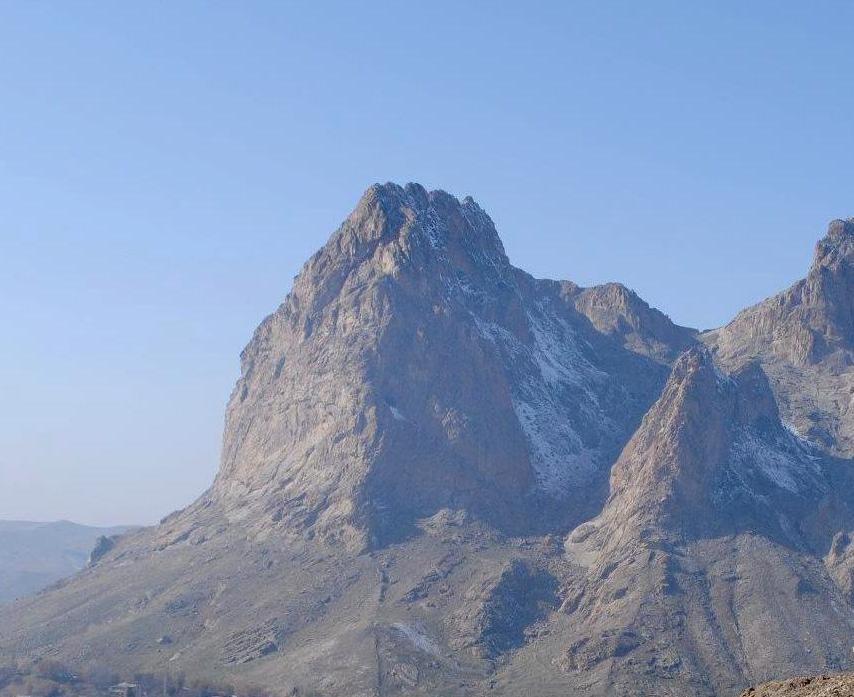
Mount Alinja

Mount Alinja is located in Julfa region of Nakhchivan, on the shore of the river with the same name as mountain. The elevation of Mount Alinja is 1811 meters. It has volcanic origins.

List of mountains of the Lesser Caucasus
Name	Original name	Elevation (m)	Ridge
Kaputjukh	Qapıcıq	3904	Zangezur
Dalidag	Dəlidağ	3616	Garabagh volcanic highland
Gamish	Gamışdağ	3724	Murovdag
Kapaz	Kəpəz	3066	Murovdag
Goshgar	Qoşqar	3361	Murovdag
Hinaldag	Hinaldağ	3367	Murovdag
Gizilboghaz	Qızılboğaz	3581	Garabagh volcanic highland
Boyuk Ishigli	Böyük Işıqlı	3550	Garabagh volcanic highland
Alinja	Əlincə	1811	Zangezur

== Talysh Mountains ==
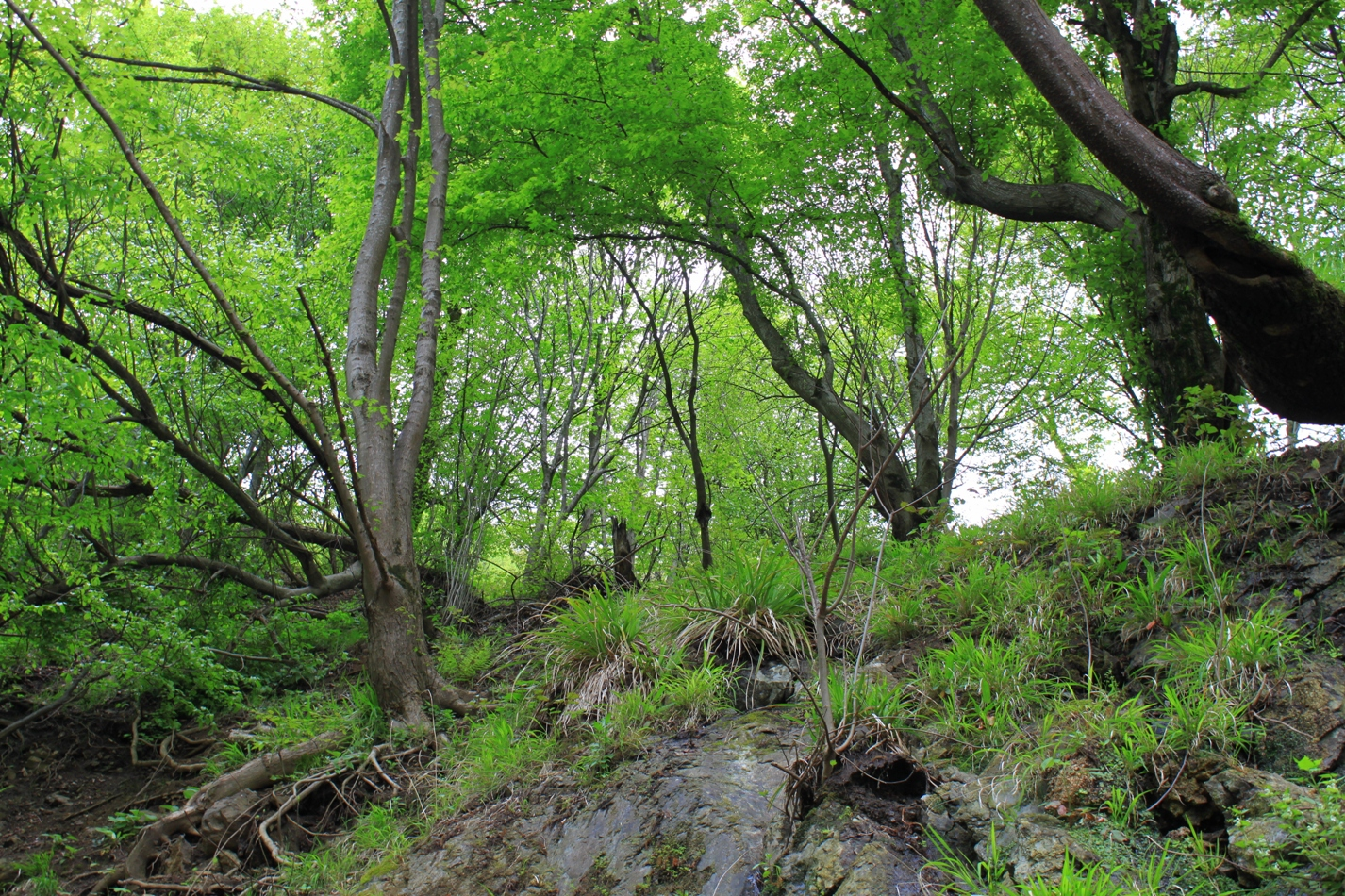
Talysh mountains in Masalli, Azerbaijan.

Talysh mountains are located in the south – east of Azerbaijan. There are three mountain ridge within the Talysh mountains, which of elevations reach 2477 meters. They are Talysh, Burovar, and Peshteser. There are few peaks that of heights are above 3,000 meters (9,800 feet). The rocks of the mountains originated from volcanic rocks and carbonate rocks that date back to the Jurassic, Cretaceous, and Paleogene periods.

=== Kyumyurkyoy ===
The highest peak of Talysh mountains is the Mount Kyumyurkyoy (2493 meters).

=== Gizyurdu ===
Mount Gizyurdu is the second highest peak of Talysh mountains with the height of 2433 meters.

List of the highest peaks of Talysh Mountains
Name	Original name	Elevation (m)
Kyumyurkyoy	Gömürgöy	2493
Gizyurdu	Qızyurdu	2433

== Other mountains ==
=== Mount Goyazan ===
The elevation of Mount Goyazan is located 20 kilometers far from Qazakh district of Azerbaijan. Its elevation is 250 meters. The mountain has volcanic origin and it is not connected to any mountain ridges. At the bottom of the mountain, there are ancient dwellings.

=== Yanar Dag ===
Yanar Dag is located 27 kilometers far from Baku. On the surface of Yanar Dag, there are fires of natural gas that flames continuously, and their height reaches to 10–15 meters.

The historical-cultural and natural reserve was established in the territory of Yanar Dag by the presidential decree dated May 2, 2007.

== Gallery ==
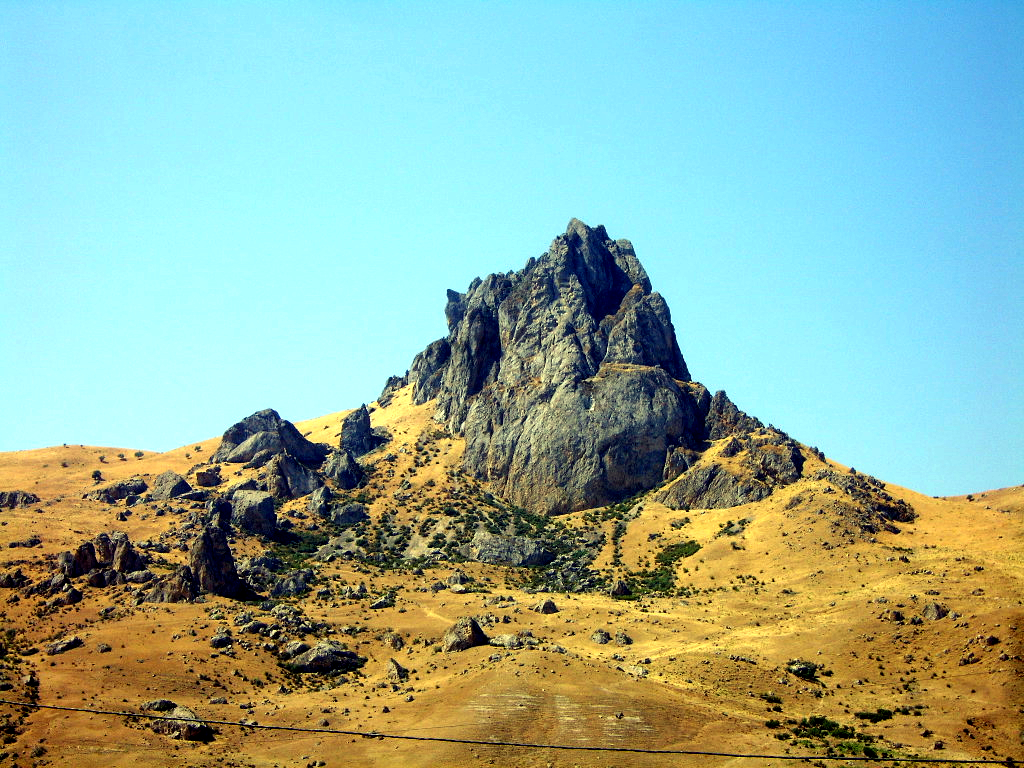
Mount Beshbarmag

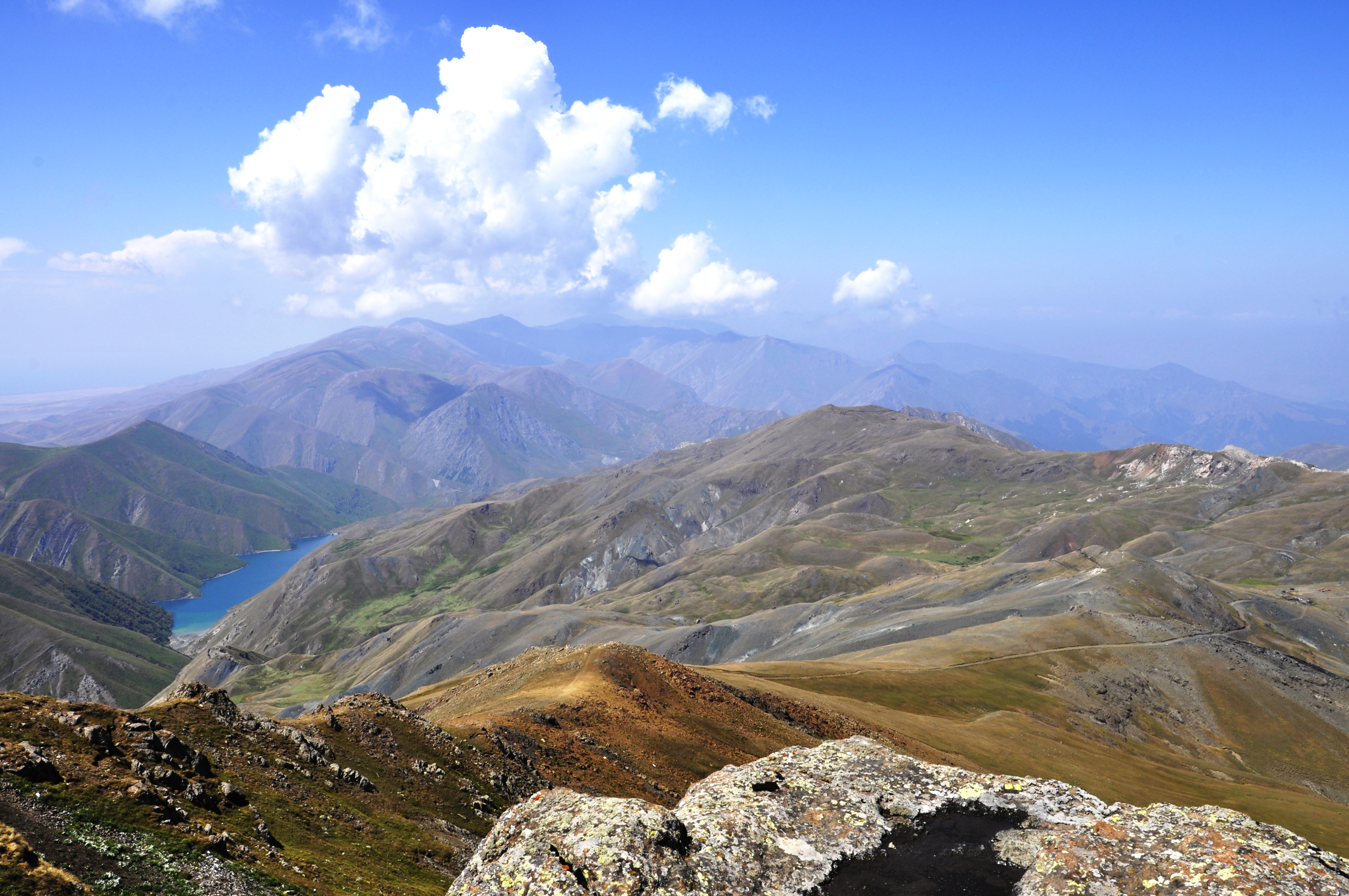
Hinaldag

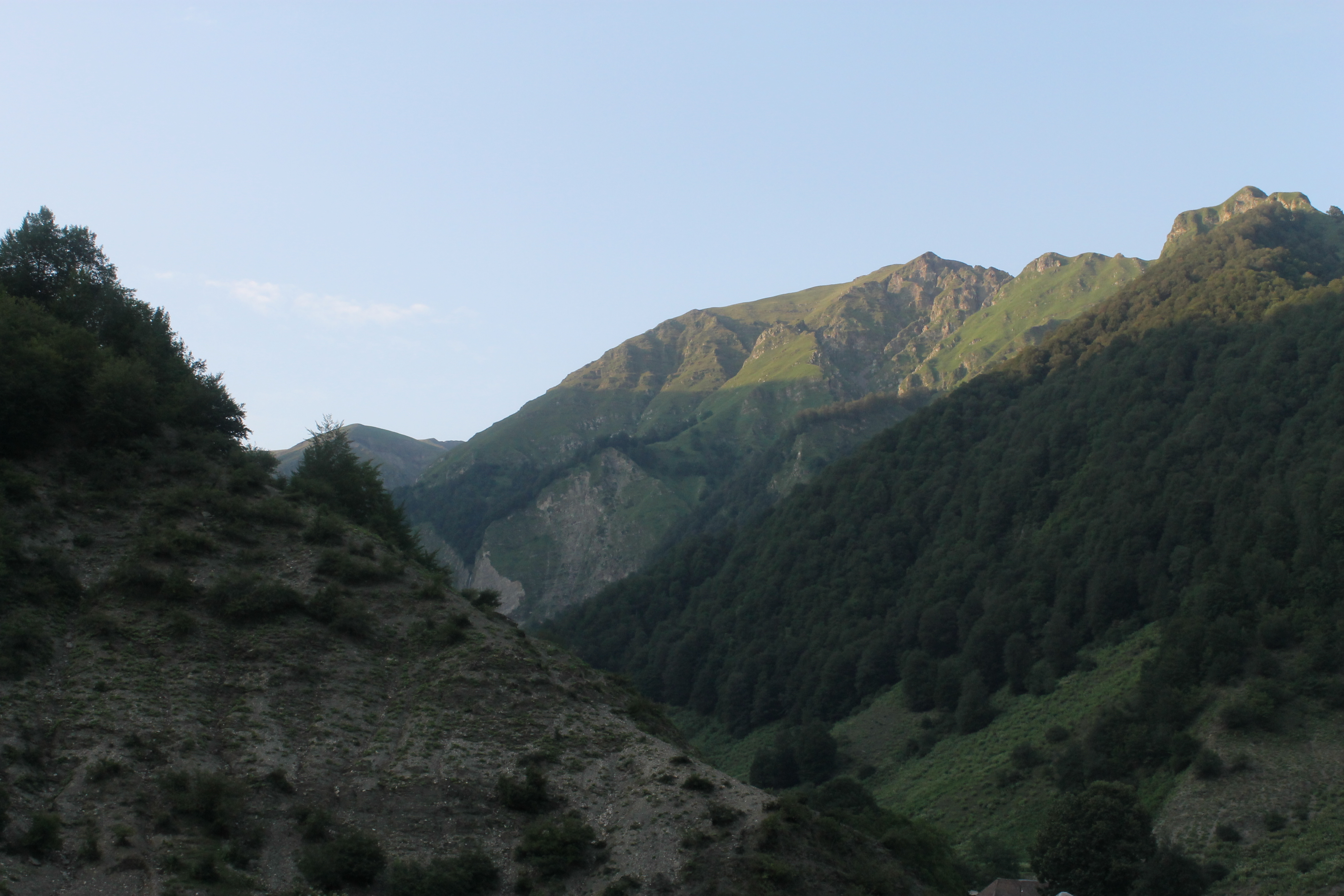
Mountains of Gabala

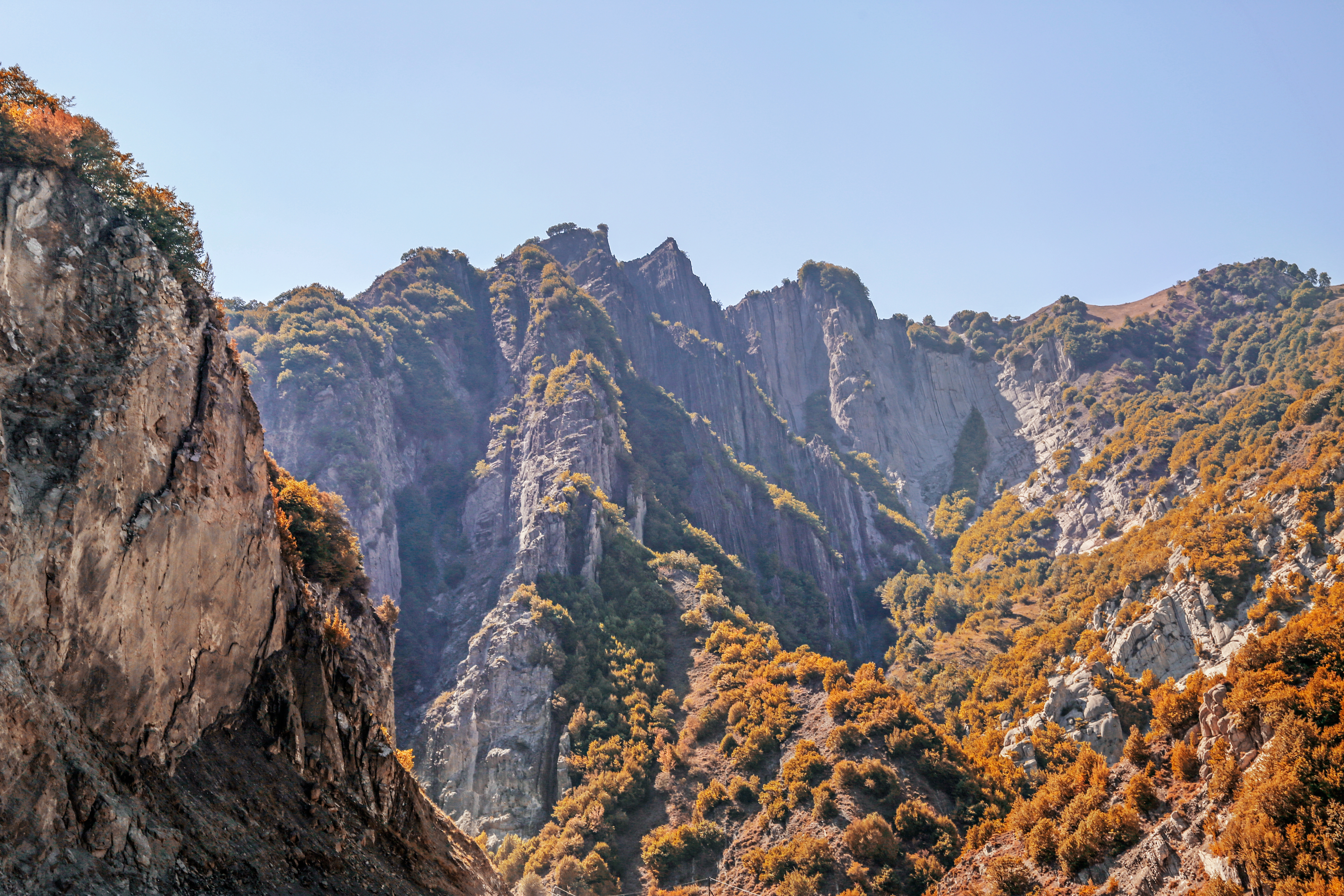
Mountains in Lahic, Ismayilli

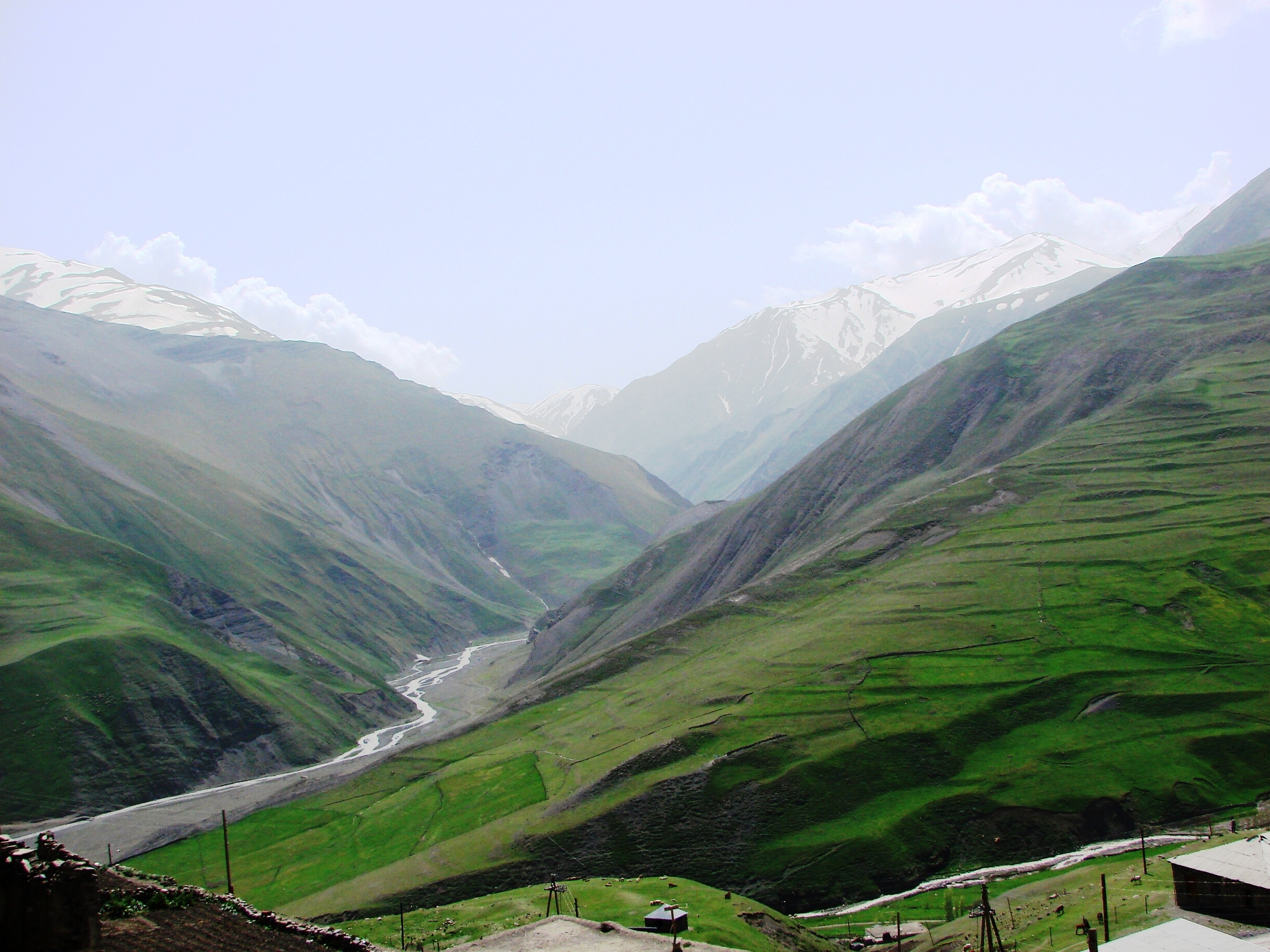
Mountains in Khinalig

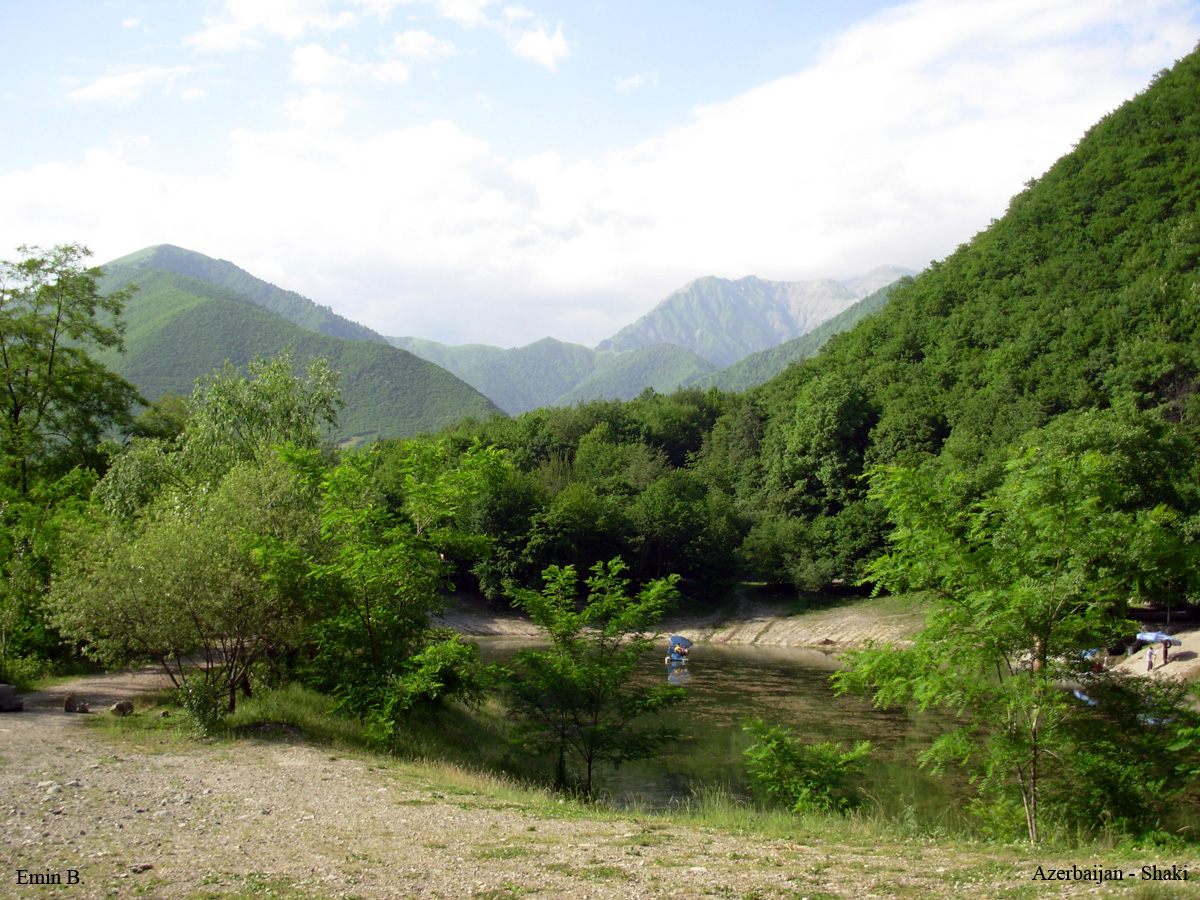
Mountains in Shaki

== See also ==
- Geography of Azerbaijan
