= List of the highest major summits of Azerbaijan =

Azerbaijan is nearly surrounded by mountains. The Greater Caucasus range lies to the northeast along the border with Russia and extends into northeastern Azerbaijan and runs southeast to the Absheron Peninsula. The Lesser Caucasus range lies to the west along the border with Armenia, and the Talysh Mountains lies to the south along the border with Iran. There are mineral springs and very active mud volcanoes in Kobustan Mountain, which is situated near Baku. The highest peaks in the Republic of Azerbaijan are situated in the Greater Caucasus, the Lesser Caucasus and Talysh mountain systems. The highest peak in the Republic of Azerbaijan is Bazardüzü (4,466 metres or 14,652 feet).

== Greater Caucasus ==
The Greater Caucasus mountain systems stretches for about 1,200 kilometers from west-northwest to east-southeast, between the Taman Peninsula of the Black Sea to the Absheron Peninsula of the Caspian Sea. Greater Caucasus ridge is not crossed by any river valleys. Therefore, it is also called Watershed ridge. Most of the ridge elevation is over, 3000m high:

Height	Name	Ridge
4466	Bazardüzü	Greater Caucasus
4243	Shahdagh	Lateral ridge
4206	Tufandağ	Greater Caucasus
4126	Bazaryurd	Greater Caucasus
4116	Yaridagh	Greater Caucasus
4079	Charindagh	Greater Caucasus
4042	Ilham	Lateral ridge
4020	Ragdan	Greater Caucasus

== Lesser Caucasus ==
The spurs of the Lesser Caucasus (also called Little Caucasus, Russian Maliy Kavkaz) in southwestern Azerbaijan includes Shahdagh, Murovdagh, Karabagh Upland, Mikhtoken, Eastern Goyche, Dereleyez and Zangezur ridges, most of the Karabakh volcanic plateau, Bashkend- Destefur saddle.

Height	Name	Ridge
3906	Kaputjugh	Zangezur
3865	Alagoz	Zangezur
3827	Yaghlidere	Zangezur
3814	Gazangoldagh	Zangezur
3754	Saridere	Zangezur
3724	Gamishdag	Murovdagh
3613	Delidagh	Mikhtoken
3560	Deveboynu	Zangezur
3549	Goshabulag	Shahdagh
3437	Keti	Eastern Goyche
3367	Hinaldagh	Shahdagh
3364	Elinje	Zangezur

== Talysh mountain systems ==
Talysh mountains (Azerbaijani: Talış dağları, Талыш дағлары, تالش داغلارى; Persian: کوههای تالش, Kuhhâye Tâleš) lies southeastward from the Lankaran Lowland in southeastern Azerbaijan to the lower part of the Sefid Rud in northwestern Iran. The Talysh mountains include Talysh, Peshteser and Burovar ridges. A few peaks rise above 2,400 m.

Height	Name	Ridge
2493	Gomurgoy	Zengezur
2433	Gizyurdu	Zengezur

== See also ==
- Mountains of Azerbaijan
