= Tufandağ =

Mountain in northern Azerbaijan

Tufandagh
- Azerbaijani: Tufandağ
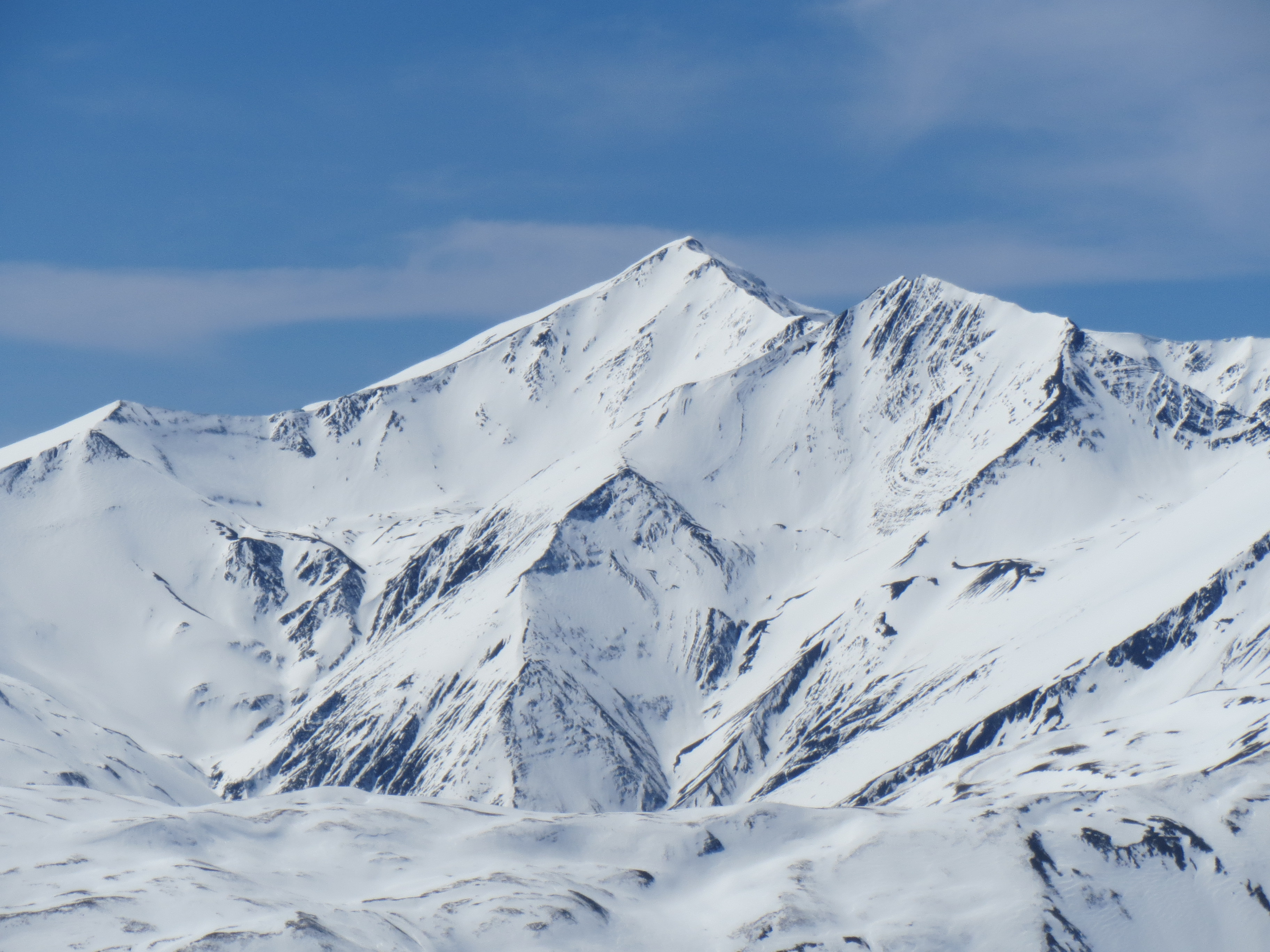

Highest point
- Elevation: 4,191 m (13,750 ft)
- Listing: Highest peaks of Azerbaijan
- Coordinates: 41°09′45″N 47°59′29″E

Geography
- Location within Caucasus Mountains Location within Azerbaijan
- Country: Azerbaijan
- District: Qusar
- Parent range: Greater Caucasus

Tufandagh is a mountain peak of the Greater Caucasus range, located in the Qusar District of Azerbaijan. With an elevation of 4,191 metres (13,750 ft) above sea level, it is the third highest mountain in Azerbaijan. It is considered the largest glacier in the area. Morphologically, the glacier belongs to the cirque and hanging types, with movement directed northward under gravitational influence, often remaining in a suspended state.

A joint expedition organized by the State Control Service for Water Use and Protection under the State Water Resources Agency of Azerbaijan and the National Hydrometeorology Service has documented the glacier's coordinates, altitude, slope orientation, and geomorphological features. Recent studies as altitudes of 3500-3800 meters indicate a reduction in the glacier's area, an acceleration of melting processes, and an increase in the number and size of surface cracks. These changes have contributed to the retreat of the glacier tongue and a rise in the water level of the Mahmuddara River, which originates from the glacier. Researchers attribute these processes to the effects of global climate change and anomalous heat periods.

According to experts, the glacier's retreat is associated with broader global climatic trends. Automatic meteorological stations in the Shahdag, Tufandağ, and Shah mountains record ongoing atmospheric and glaciological conditions in the region.
