= Mount Guton =

Mountain in Azerbaijan and Russia

- Location within Azerbaijan Location within Europe

Highest point
- Elevation: 3,648 m (11,969 ft)
- Coordinates: 41°51′44″N 46°45′35″E

Geography
- Location: Azerbaijan–Daghestan border
- Countries: Azerbaijan and Russian Federation
- Parent range: Main Caucasian Range; Greater Caucasus

Guton (Azerbaijani: Quton dağı) is a mountain on the border of the Republic of Azerbaijan (Balakan and Zagatala districts) and the Russian Federation (Republic of Dagestan). The southern slopes of Guton are included in the frame of the territory of the Zagatala Reserve.

== Geography ==
The mountain is located on the crest of the Main Caucasian Range. Its height constitutes - 3648 m. On the slopes of Guton, the Samur and Katekhchay rivers originate. Here are subalpine and alpine meadows, while the top of the mountain is rocky. The mountain is part of a region known for its rich natural and recreational resources, including mineral springs, diverse flora and fauna, and scenic landscapes. Mount Guton and its surrounding contribute to the development of ecotourism, offering opportunities for hiking, nature observation, and exploration of historical and cultural sites in the area.

== See also ==
- Mount Bazardüzü
