= Shahdag Mountain Resort =

Winter resort in Azerbaijan

Coordinates: 41°19′18″N 48°08′53″E

Shahdagh Mountain Resort
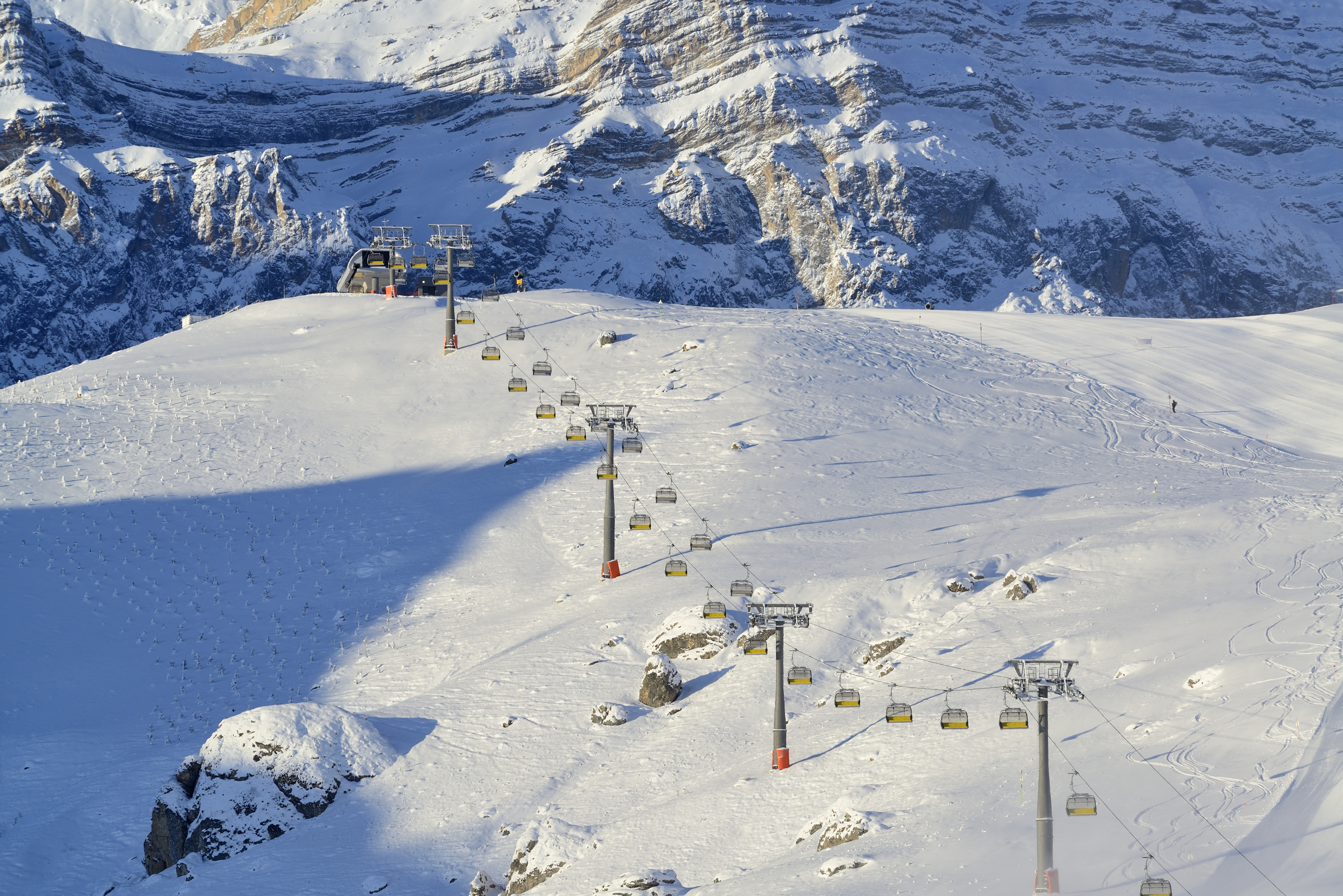
- Ski Lift in Shahdagh
- Interactive map of Shahdagh Mountain Resort
- Location: Mount Shahdagh
- Nearest city: Qusar
- Top elevation: 2,525
- Base elevation: 1,435
- Skiable area: 126 ha (310 acres)
- Lift system: 12 Lifts
- Website: shahdag.az

Shahdagh Mountain Resort (Azerbaijani: Şahdağ Turizm Mərkəzi) is Azerbaijan's first and largest winter resort.

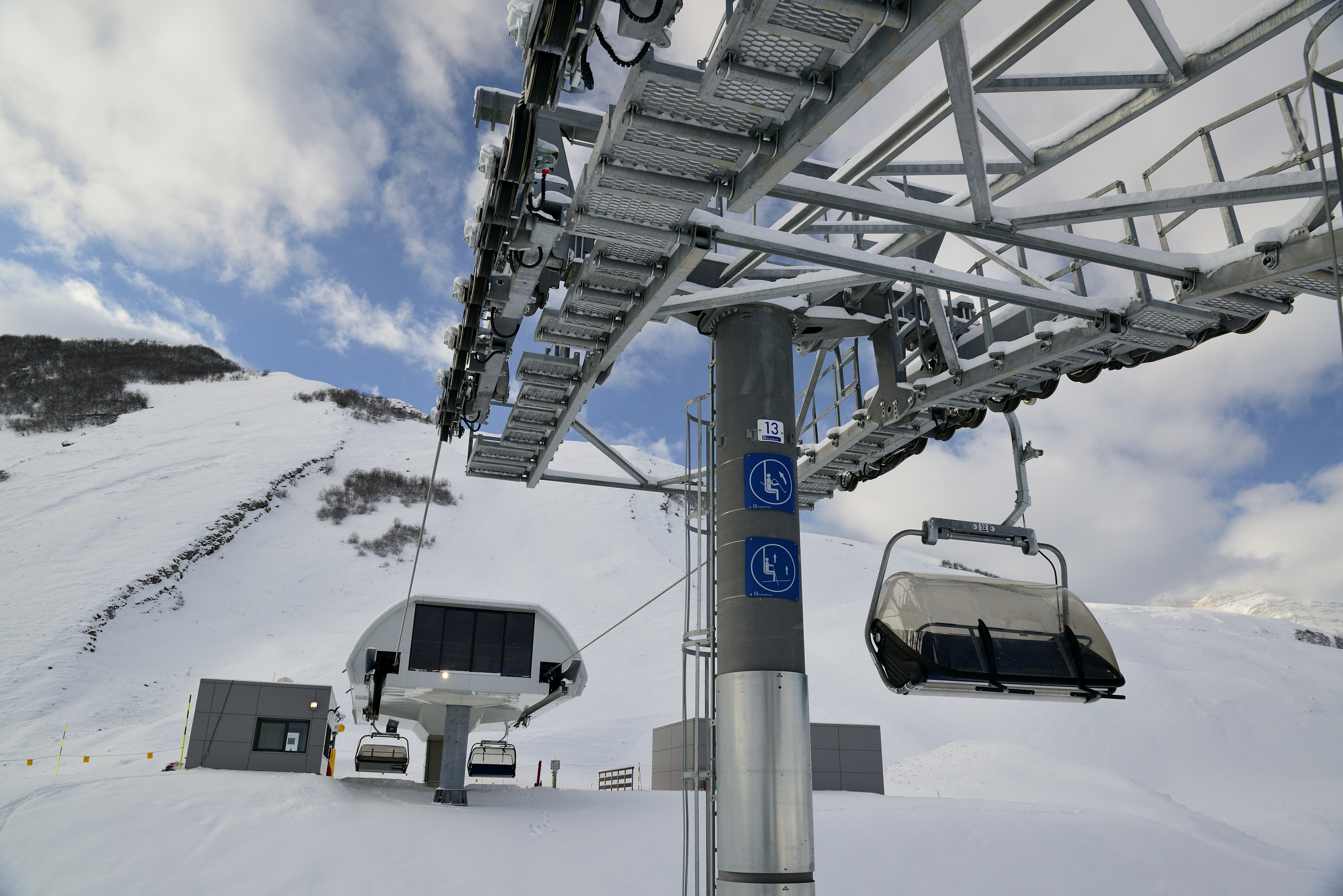
Ski Lift Working in Shahdagh

== Resort ==
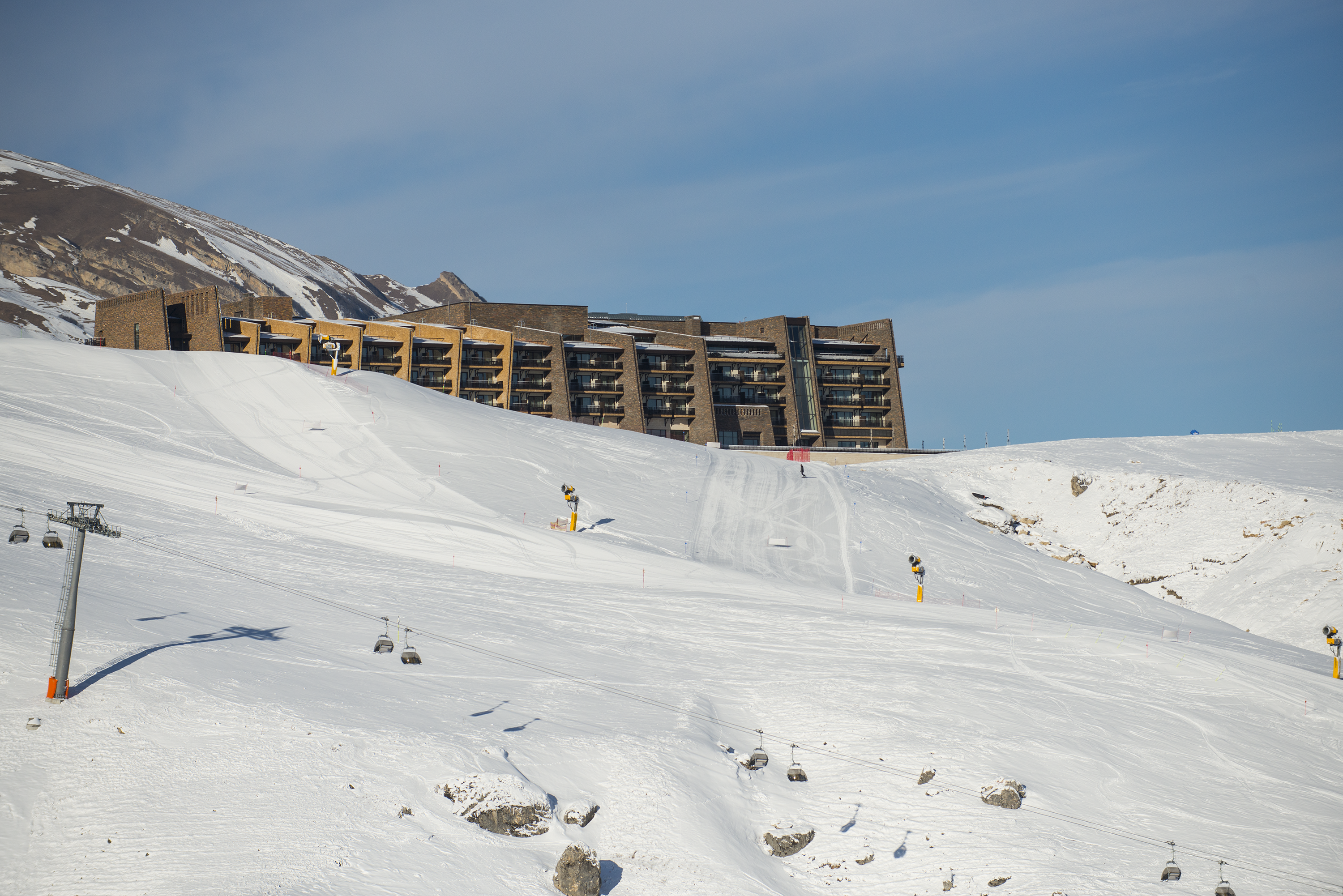
Shahdag Slopes and Shahdag Hotel & Resort

Opened to the public in 2012, the Shahdag Mountain Resort Complex (Şahdağ Turizm Mərkəzi) is located in the Greater Caucasus range in Azerbaijan. The resort lies in close proximity to Shahdag National Park, a protected area renowned for its well-preserved ecological system and flora and fauna.

== Facilities ==
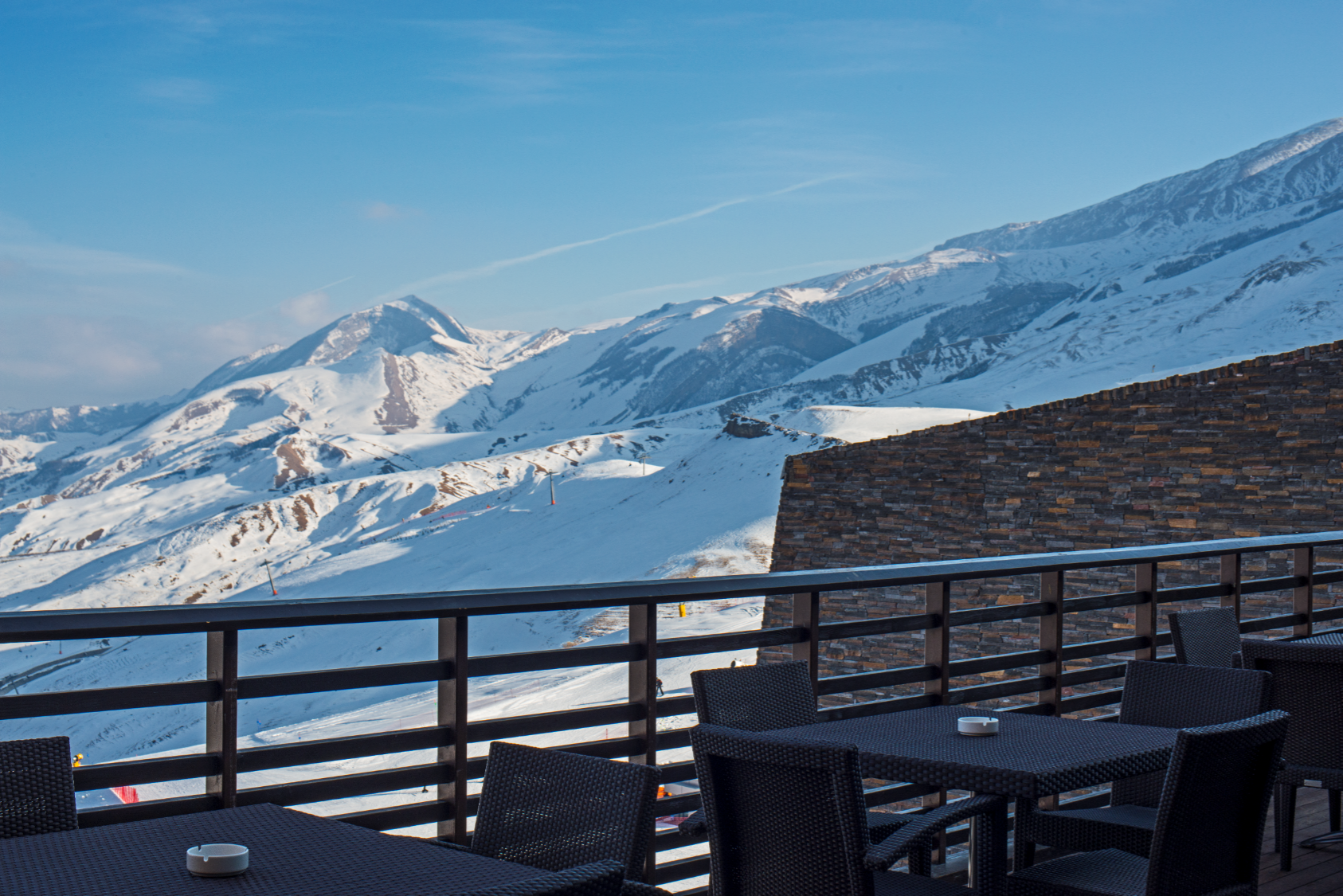
View of Mountains from Hotel Shahdagh

Ice Bar Shahdagh

Shahdagh Snow Gun Working

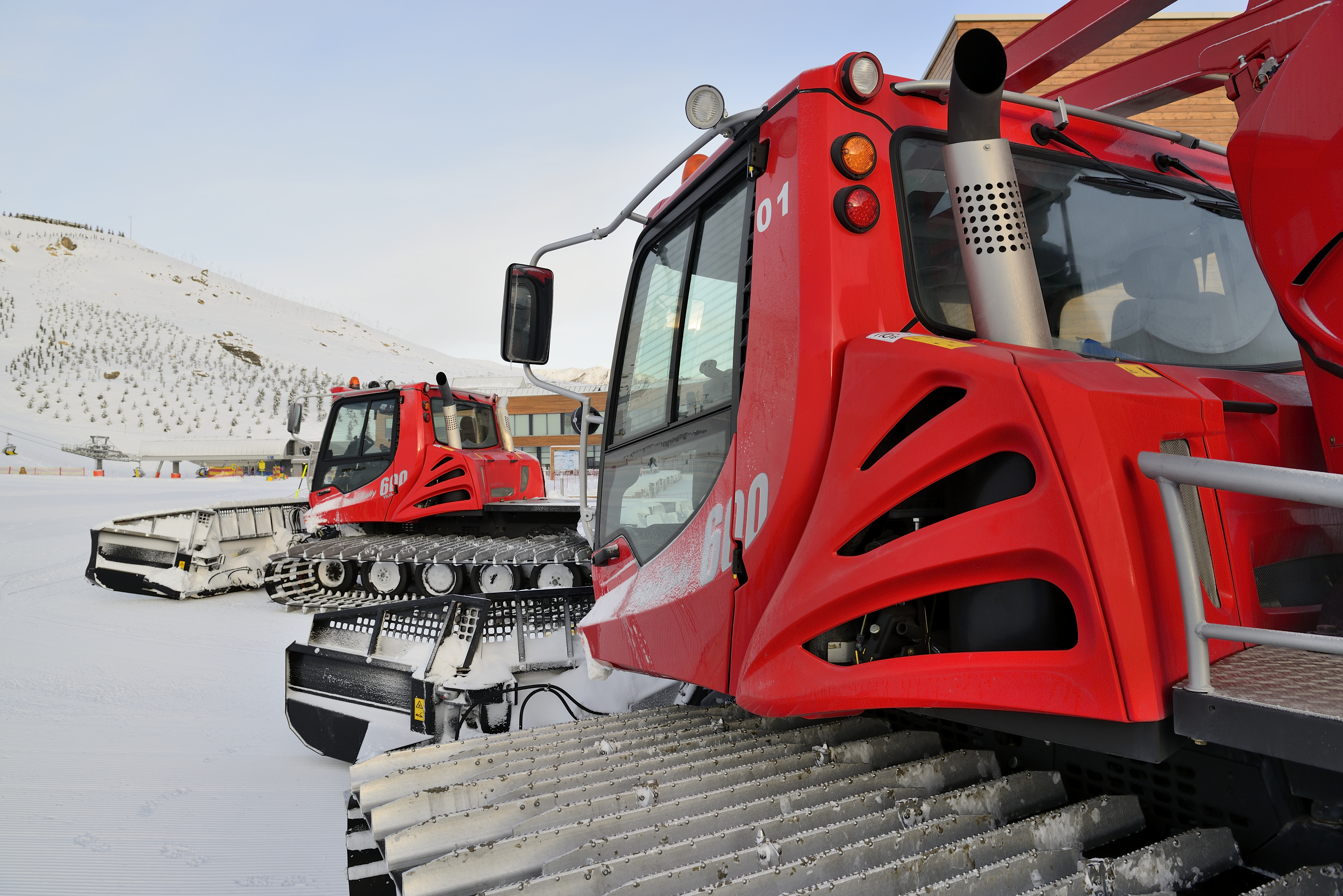
Snowgrooming machines Shahdagh

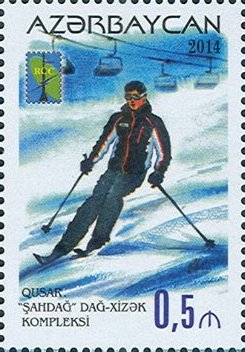
Stamp of Azerbaijan Ski

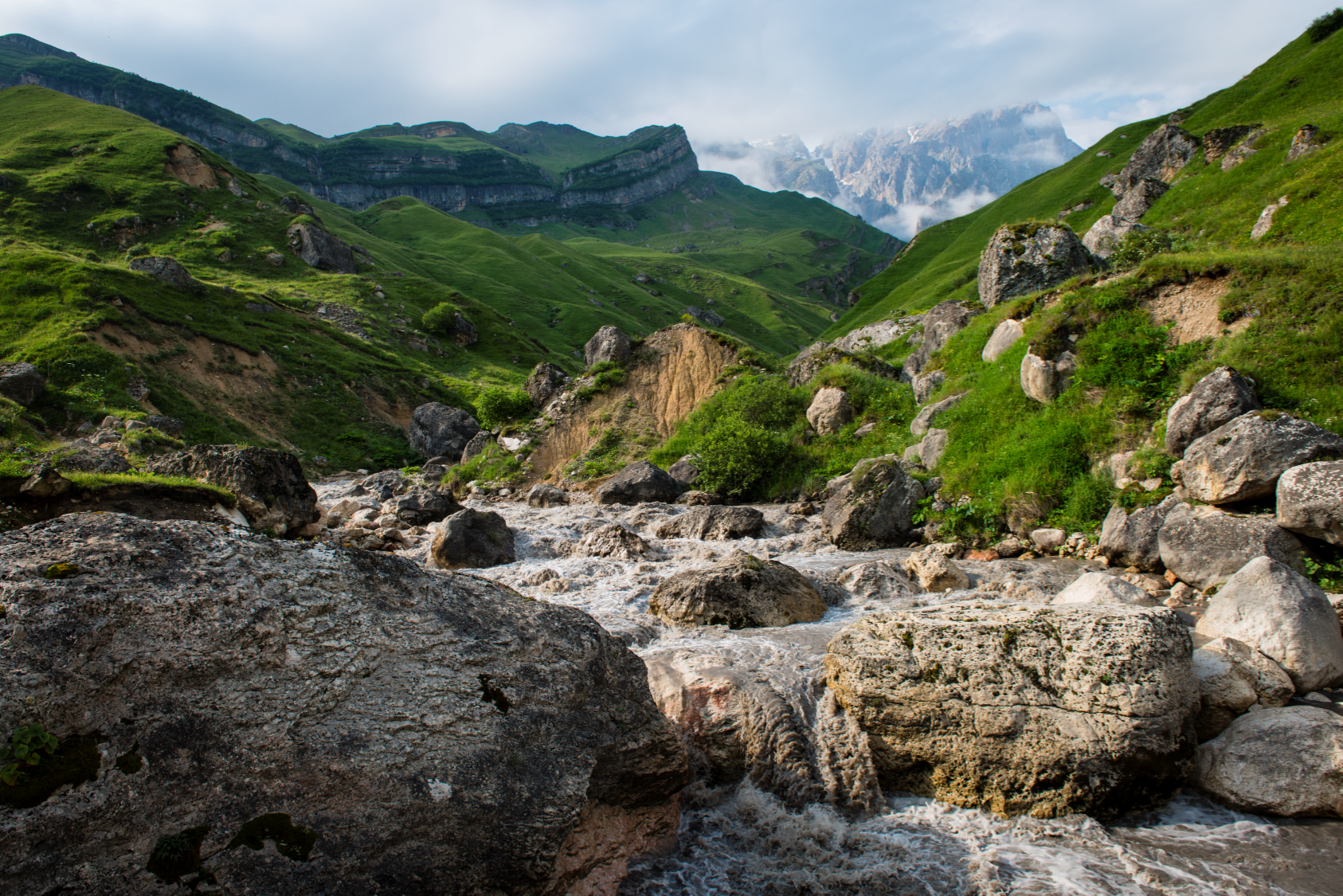
Shahdagh in the summer

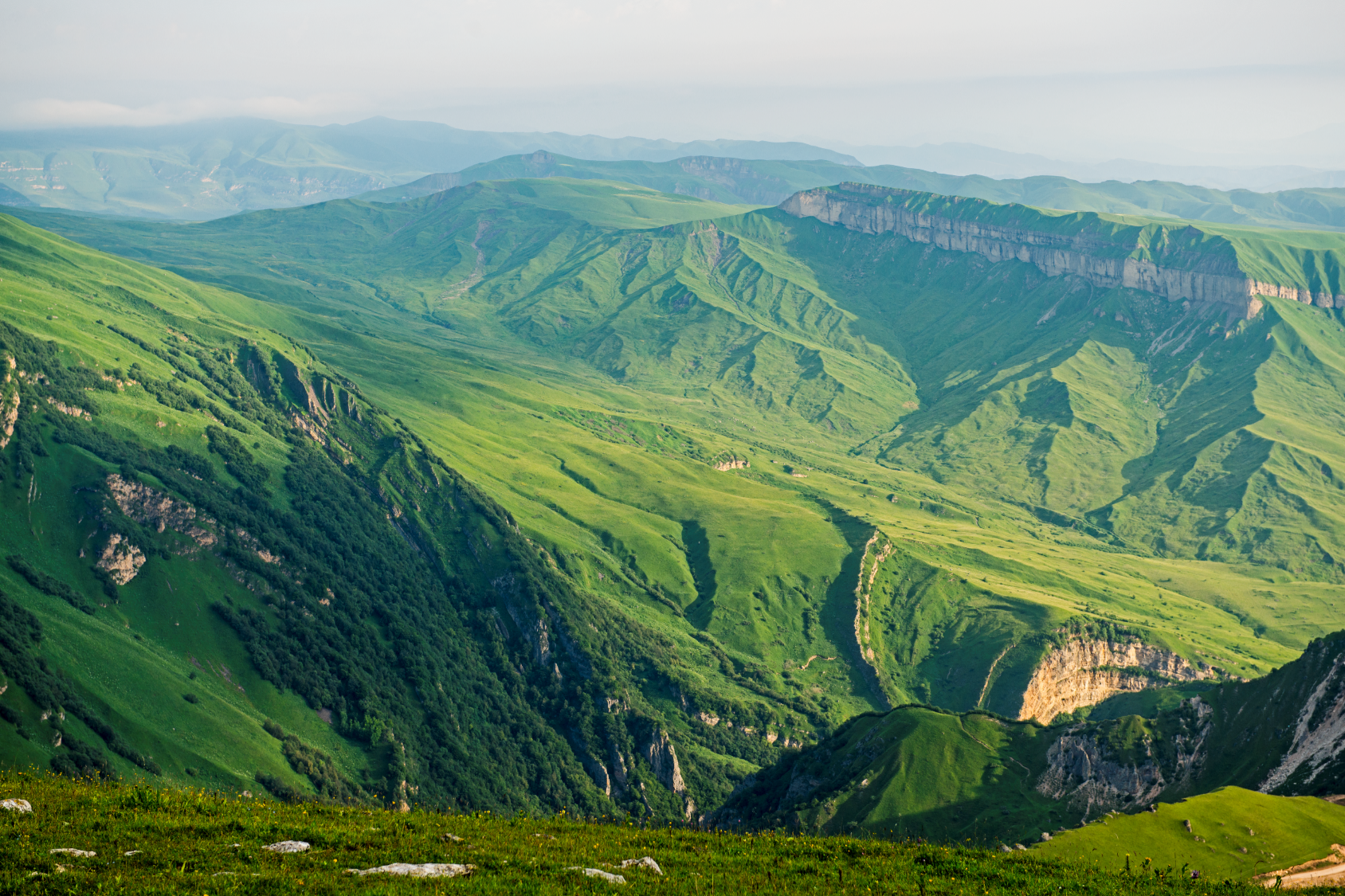
Shahdagh in the summer

The winter season in Shahdag typically begins in the second half of December and concludes in early April, subject to snow conditions. Seasonal opening dates and operational updates are regularly provided on the official Shahdag Resort website.

=== Main Developer ===
Ministry of Culture and Tourism (Azerbaijan) / "SHAHDAG MOUNTAIN RESORT" CJSC / State Tourism Agency of the Republic of Azerbaijan

=== Operator ===
PGI Management

=== Elevation difference ===
1,435 - 2,552 m

=== Passenger capacity ===
- 25,000 skiers/hour

=== Skiable area ===
- 45 km skiable

=== Lifts ===
20 Lifts in total:

- 3 Gondolas for 8 people
- 10 detachable grip Chairlifts with 4 seats each
- 2 Platter Lifts
- 5 Magic Carpets

=== Slopes ===
37 Slopes in total:

- 8 green
- 17 blue
- 8 red
- 4 black

=== Produced snow ===
- 532 snow guns guaranteeing 100% of the resort's skiable area

=== Ski School ===
There are 3 Ski and Mountain School with national and international instructors

- Zirve Hotel Shahdag
- Shahdag Hotel & Spa
- Pik Palace

=== Kids Club ===
Kindergarten / Kids Club

- Zirve Hotel Shahdag
- Shahdag Hotel & Spa

=== Rescue and medical service ===
There is a rescue service in all of the slopes and a Medical Centre at Zirve Hotel.

=== Winter activities ===
- Zip-line
- Shahdag Coaster
- Snowboarding
- Skiing
- Off-road tours and expeditions
- Polaris tour
- Winter paintball
- Snow tubing
- Shooting
- Ice rink
- Segway
- Snow shoeing
- Archery
- Trekking in the mountains
- Ski tour
- Quad and buggy tours
- Tour by snowplow
- Snowmobile tour
- Horseback riding
- Adventure park for kids
- Trampoline tower for kids
- Lifts for pedestrians
- Quads for kids
- VR Zone
- Catapult
- Swing
- Motocross
- Activity packages
- Telescope

Other activities:

- Park Cinema Shahdag
- Shahdag Kids Karting
- Photo services

=== Shop and Rentals ===
- Zirve Hotel
- Shahdag Hotel & Spa
- Pik Palace
- Main Square

=== Accommodation ===
Currently there are 5 Hotels opened. Current hotel beds in Shahdag Mountain Resort:

- Shahdag Hotel & Spa - 4* (346 beds)
- Zirve Hotel Shahdag - 3* (86 beds)
- Gaya Residences Shahdag (62 beds)
- Pik Palace Autograph Collection - 5* (334 beds)
- Park Chalet Autograph Collection - 5* (328 beds)

1,156 beds in total

=== Restaurants ===
20+ restaurants, caffés & bars:

- Shahdag Hotel & Spa and surroundings: Miras Restaurant, Xezine Bar, Menzere Restaurant, Sess RestoBar, Shahdag Pub, Scalini, Fryday, Lviv Handmade Chocolate
- Zirve Hotel Shahdag and surroundings: Rahat Bar, Qalateya Restaurant, Ferma Art, Pizzeria, Badam, Traditional Hungarian Trdelnik, Qondola cafe
- Gaya Residences Shahdag: Alov Restaurant
- Pik Palace Autograph Collection: Alpina Brasserie & Wine Bar, Chocolat Patisserie Cafe
- Park Chalet Autograph Collection: Aspen Grill Restaurant, Aspen Lounge, Aspen Bar

=== SPA and Wellness ===
3 SPA, Wellness and Fitness Centres:

- Shahdag Hotel & Spa: Ovdan & Fitness Centre (3.000 m2)
- Pik Palace Autograph Collection: SPA, The Club Fitness Centre (1.700 m2)
- Park Chalet Autograph Collectio: SPA, The Club Fitness Centre (543 m2)

=== Conference Centres ===
There are 4 Conference Centres located in:

- Shahdagh Hotel & Spa
- Zirve Hotel
- Park Chalet Autograph Collection
- Pik Palace Autograph Collection

=== Parking ===
Car Parks:

- Outside parking: Welcome plaza
- Main Plaza
- Zirve Hotel
- Shahdagh Hotel & Spa
- Gaya Residences
- Pik Palace
- Park Chalet
- Gondola Parking

== Shahdagh in the Summer ==
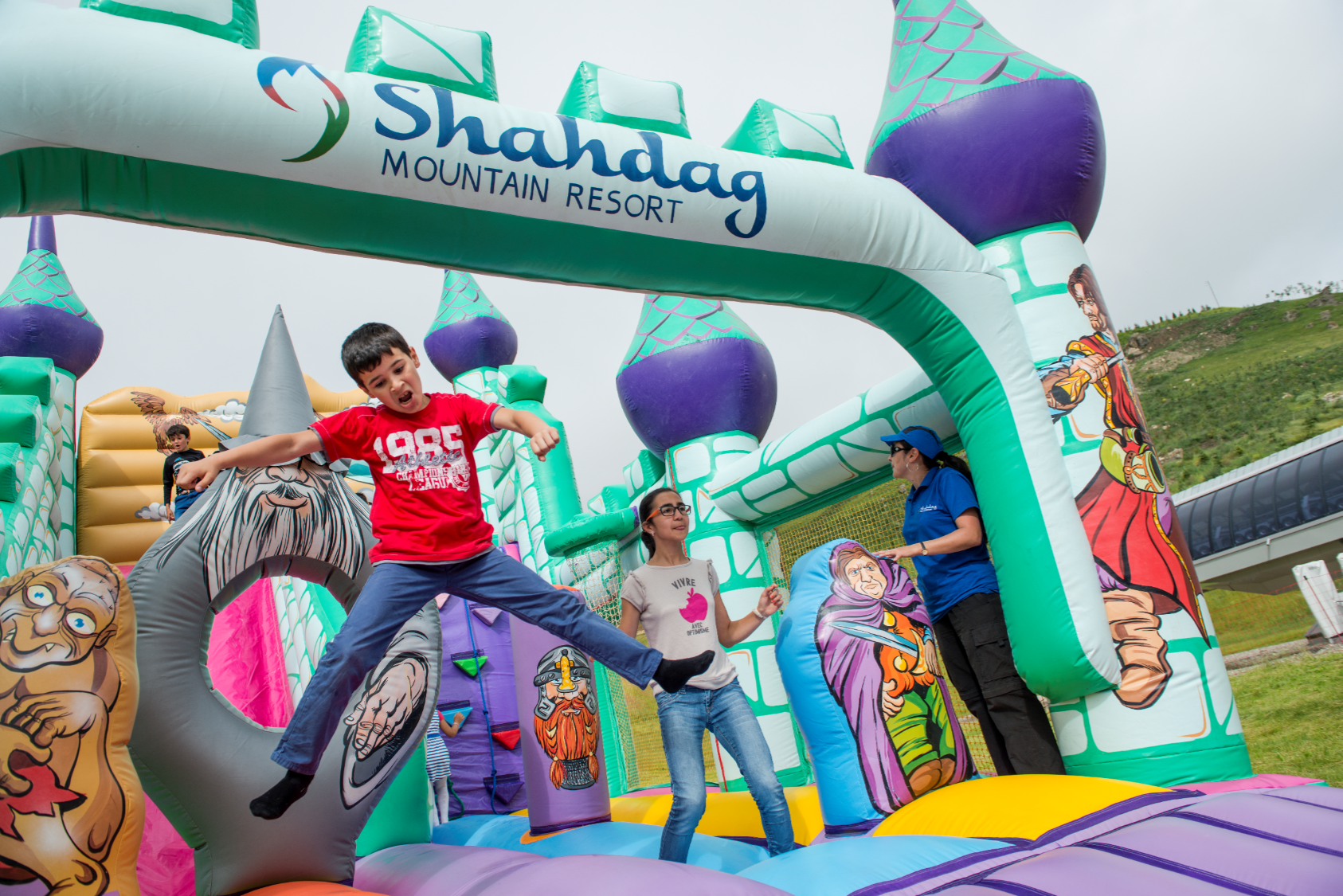
Bouncy Castle in Shahdagh

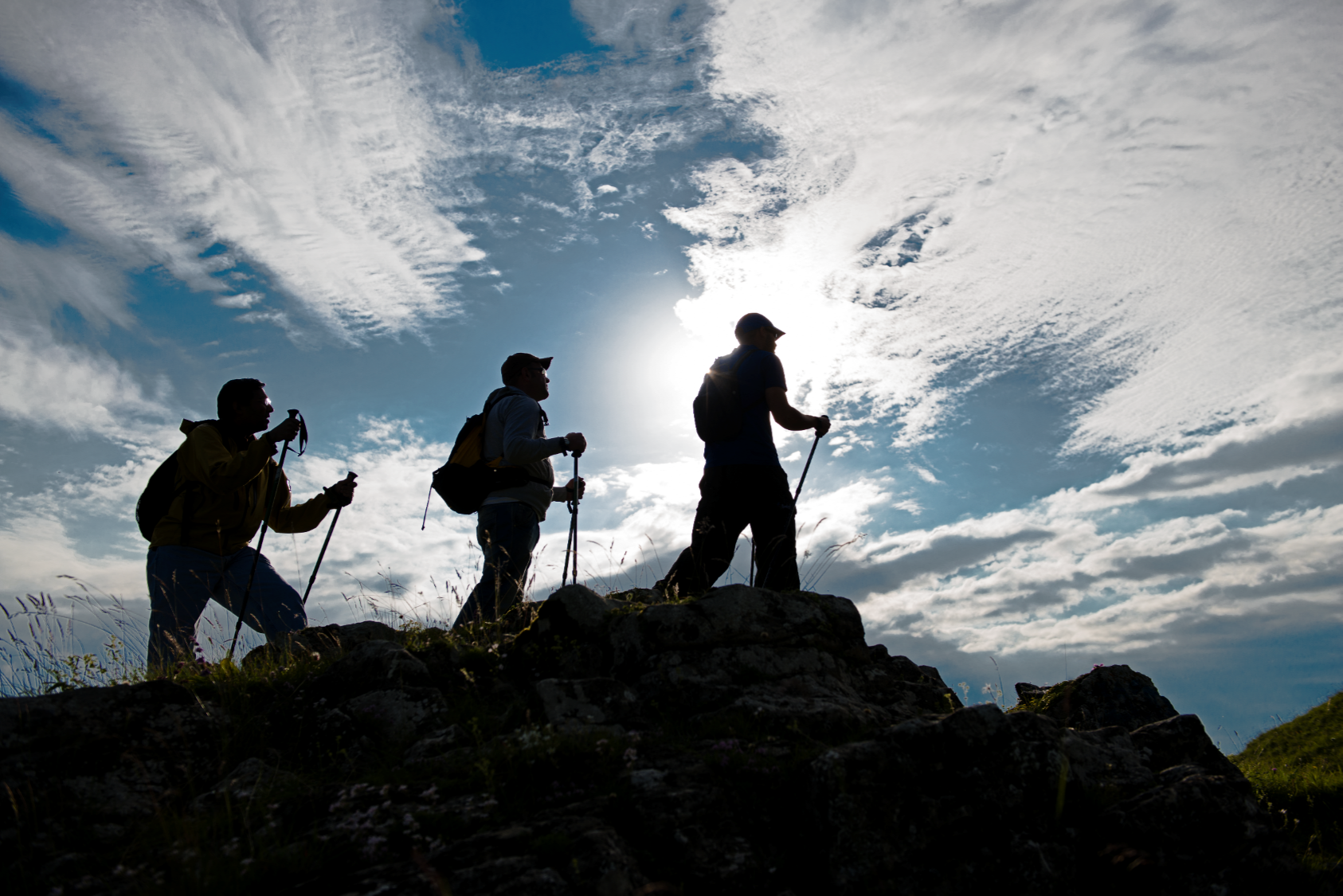
Nordic Walking & Trekkings in Shahdagh

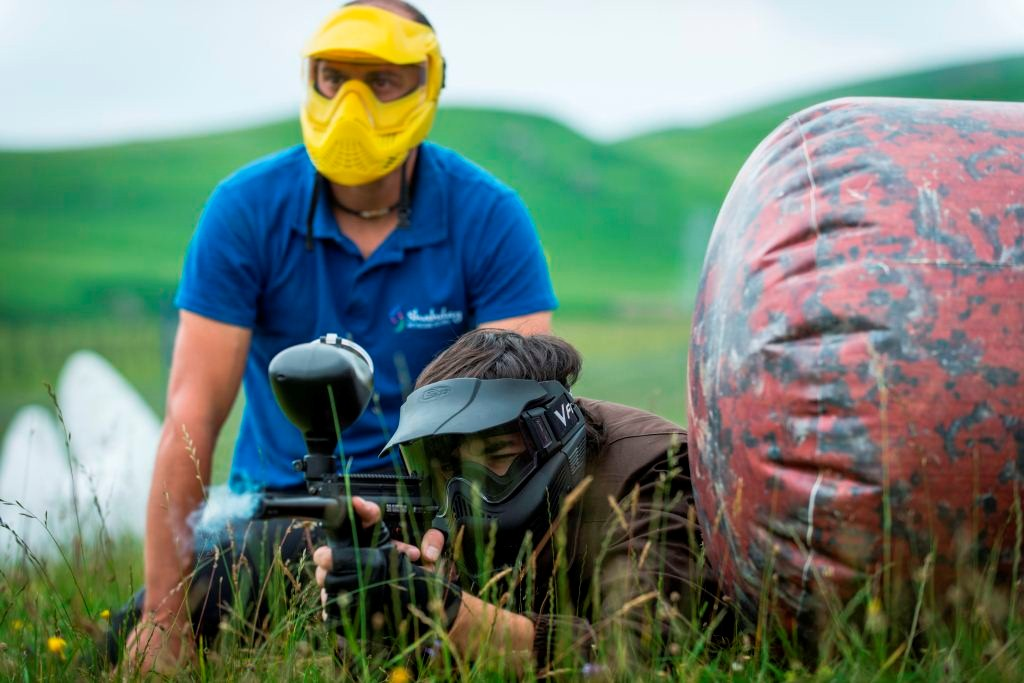
Paint Ball in Shahdagh

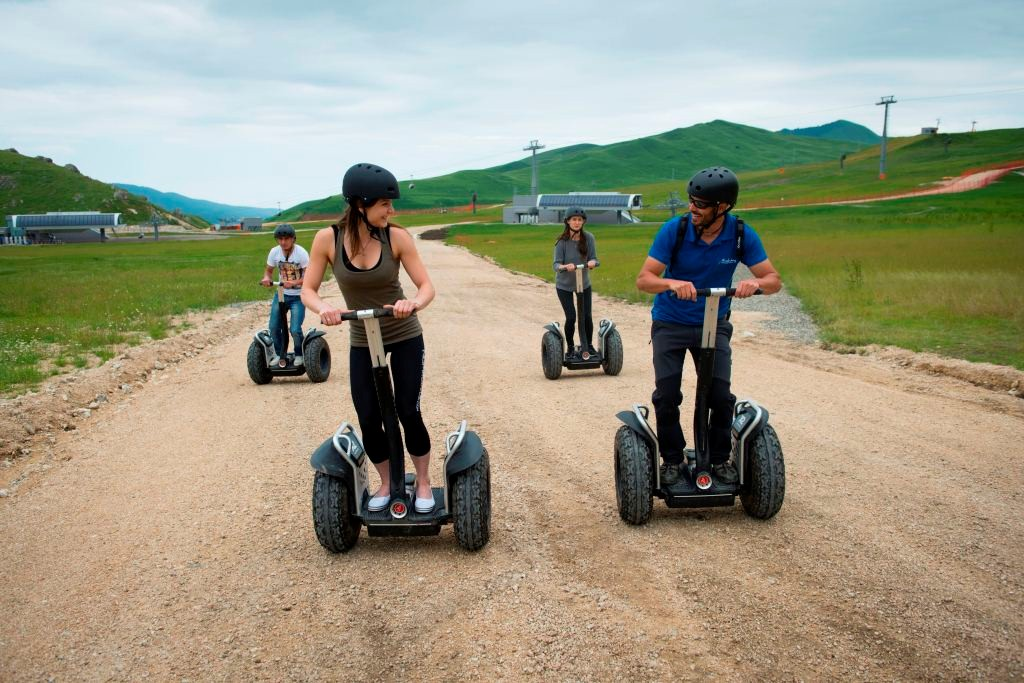
Segway in Shahdagh

=== List of summer activities ===
- Swimming in the lake
- Shahdag Coaster
- Lifts for pedestrians
- Paragliding
- Off-road tours
- Quad and buggy tours
- Segway
- Paintball
- Mountain cycling
- Bobkart
- Horseback riding
- Shooting
- Water slide for kids
- Camping
- Polaris tour
- Archery
- Catamaran
- Trekking in mountains
- Football
- Volleyball
- Trampoline
- Trampoline tower for kids
- Electric cars for children
- Adventure park for kids
- Quad tours for children
- Catapult
- VR Zone
- Swing
- Basketball
- Motocross
- Scooter
- Activity packages
- Fishing
- Off-road scooters
- Tubing
- Shahdag Kids Karting
- Telescope

== See also ==
- Mount Shahdagh
- Shahdagh National Park
- Tourism in Azerbaijan
- Ministry of Culture and Tourism (Azerbaijan)
- Azerbaijan
