= Shahdag National Park =

Shahdag National Park Şahdağ Milli Parkı
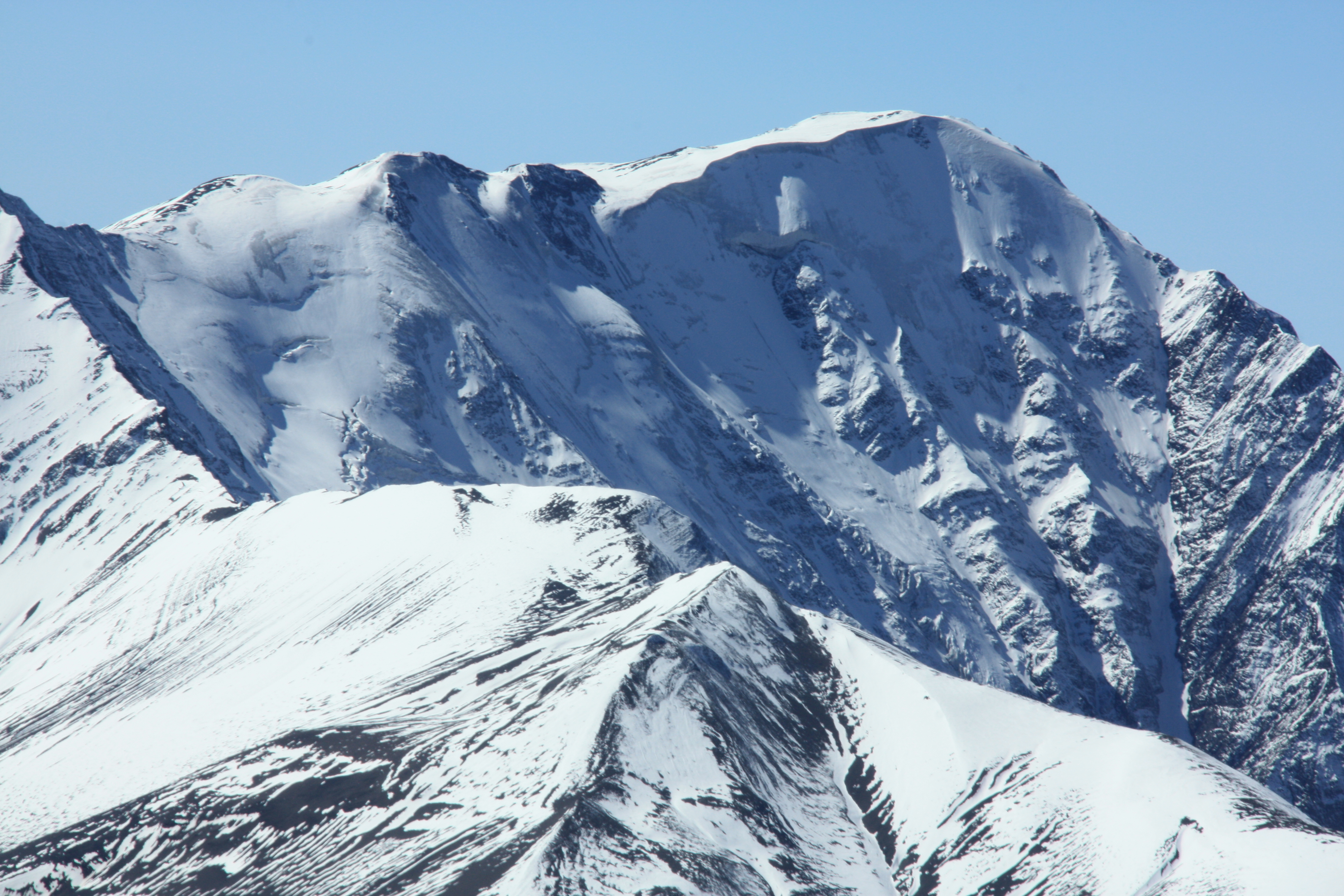
- Mount Bazardüzü is located in the park

- Location within Azerbaijan
- 40°55′26″N 48°15′10″E
- Location: Quba Rayon; Qusar Rayon; İsmayıllı Rayon; Qəbələ Rayon; Oğuz Rayon; Şamaxı Rayon

Site notes
- Area: 130,508.1 hectares (1,305.081 km^{2})
- Governing body: Republic of Azerbaijan; Ministry of Ecology and Natural Resources

Shahdag National Park (Azerbaijani: Şahdağ Milli Parkı) — is a national park of Azerbaijan. It was established initially over 115,900 hectares (1,159 km^{2}) in the Quba Rayon, Qusar Rayon, İsmayıllı Rayon, Qəbələ Rayon, Oğuz Rayon and Şamaxı Rayon administrative districts on December 8, 2006. It was enlarged by presidential decree on July 8, 2010 from 115,900 hectares (1,159 km^{2}) to 130,508.1 hectares (1,305.081 km^{2}).

It is located in northern Azerbaijan, close to the border with Russia at the Greater Caucasus Mountains. Mount Bazardüzü, the highest mountain of Azerbaijan is located in Shadag National Park. The Shahdag National Park is the largest national park not only Azerbaijan but in the whole Caucasus.

The World Bank has allocated a $17 million loan and $8 million grant for the national park's creation, while the government of Japan has provided $8 million as a grant for the project implementation. The Shahdag National Park will help address ecological issues and build a tourist infrastructure in the Caucasus for visitors.

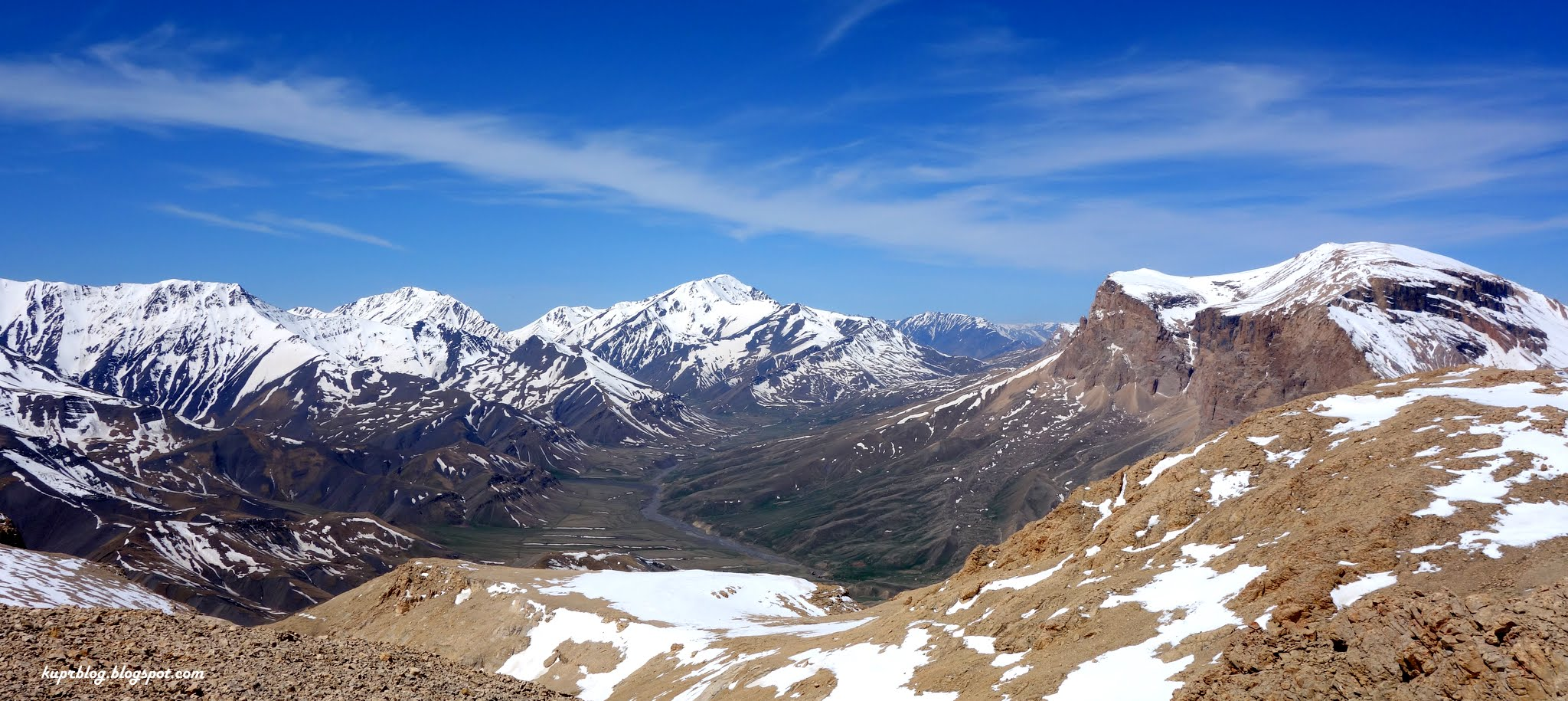
Mount Tufan, Bazaryurt, Bazarduzu and Shakhdag in May

== Flora and fauna ==
=== Flora ===
The major types of trees are Caucasian Oak (Quercus macranthera), Caucasian Ash (Fraxinus angustifolia subsp. oxycarpa), European Hornbeam (Carpinus betulus), Oriental Hornbeam (Carpinus orientalis), Oriental Beech (Fagus orientalis), Silver Birch (Betula pendula), White Birch (Betula pubescens), Common Yew (Taxus baccata), White Willow (Salix alba), Common Walnut (Juglans regia), Wild Cherry (Prunus avium), Caucasian Pear (Pyrus communis subsp. caucasica), etc.

Shrub species occurring in the area include Various-Leaved Hawthorn (Crataegus heterophylla), Dog Rose (Rosa canina), Blackberry (Rubus fruticosus), Common Medlar (Mespilus germanica), European Barberry (Berberis vulgaris), etc.

Flora of Shahdag National Park

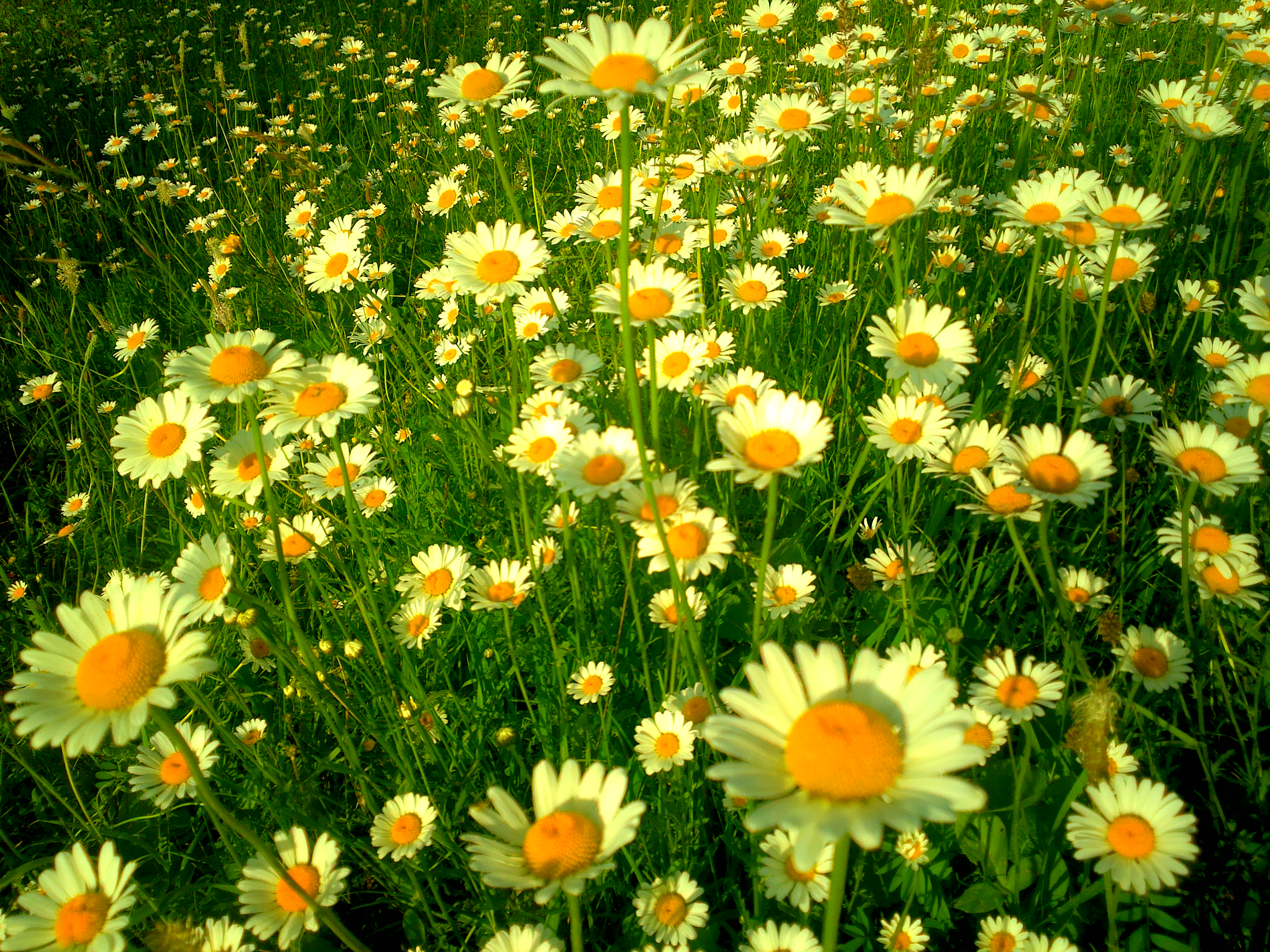

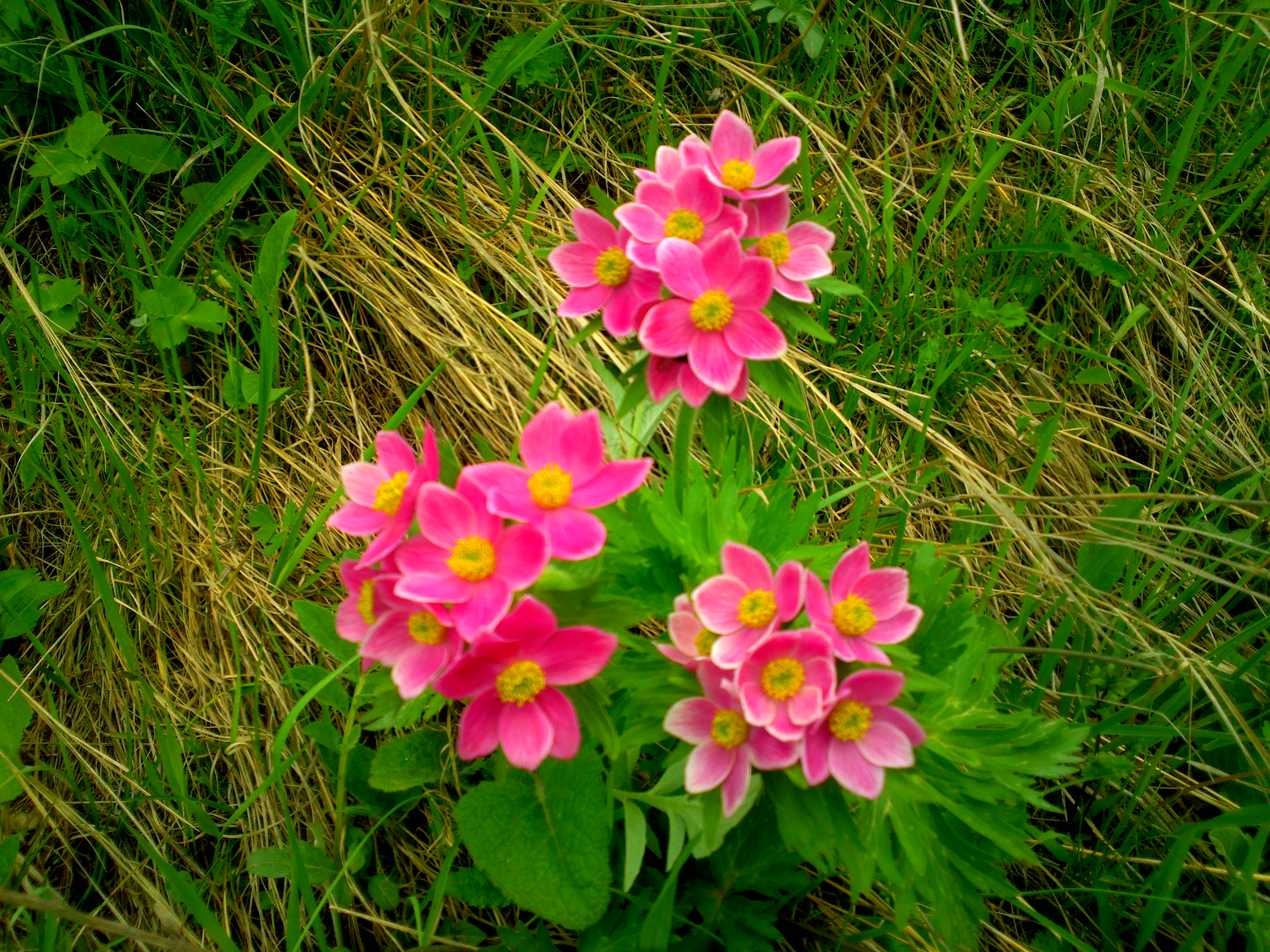

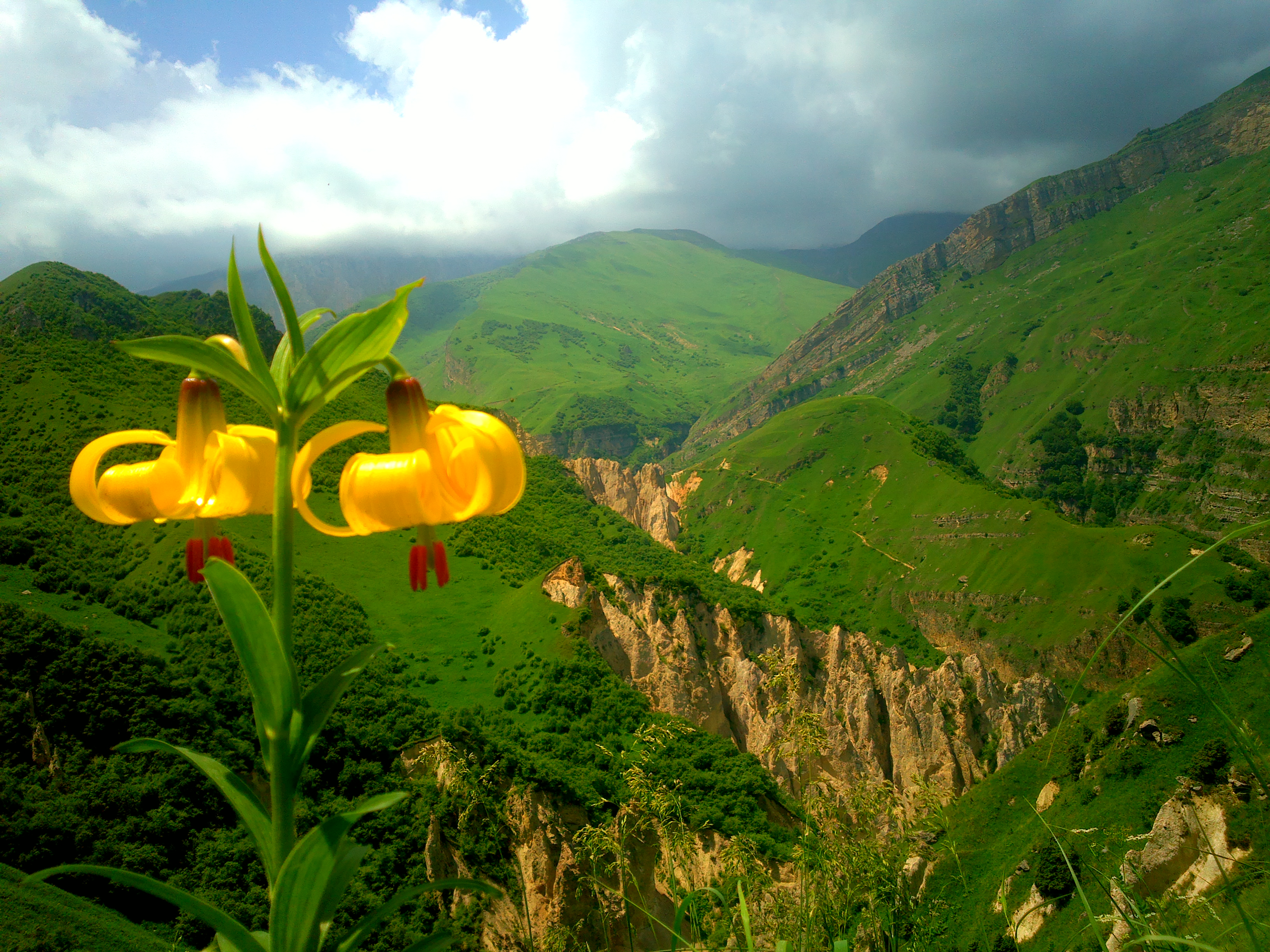

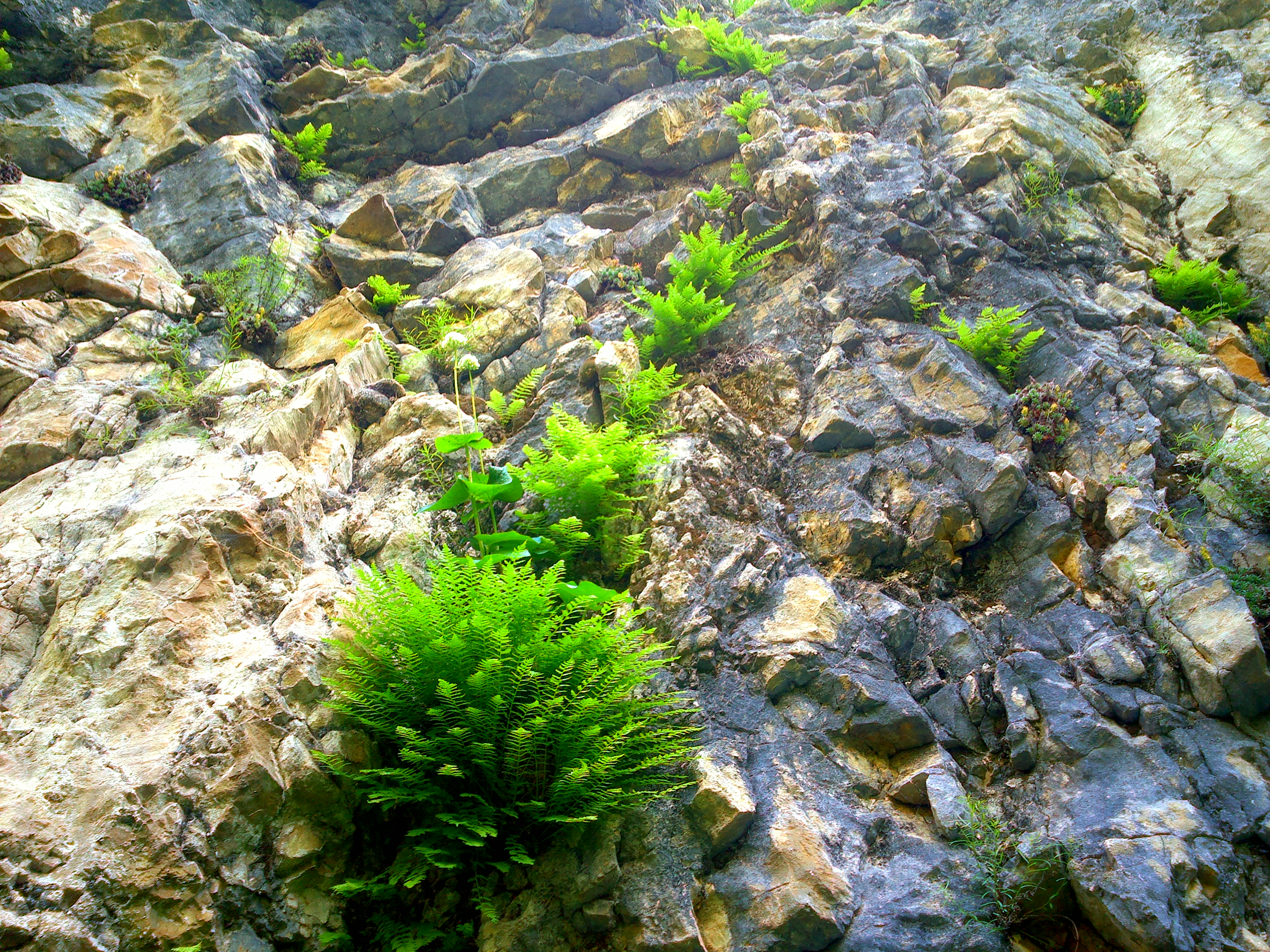

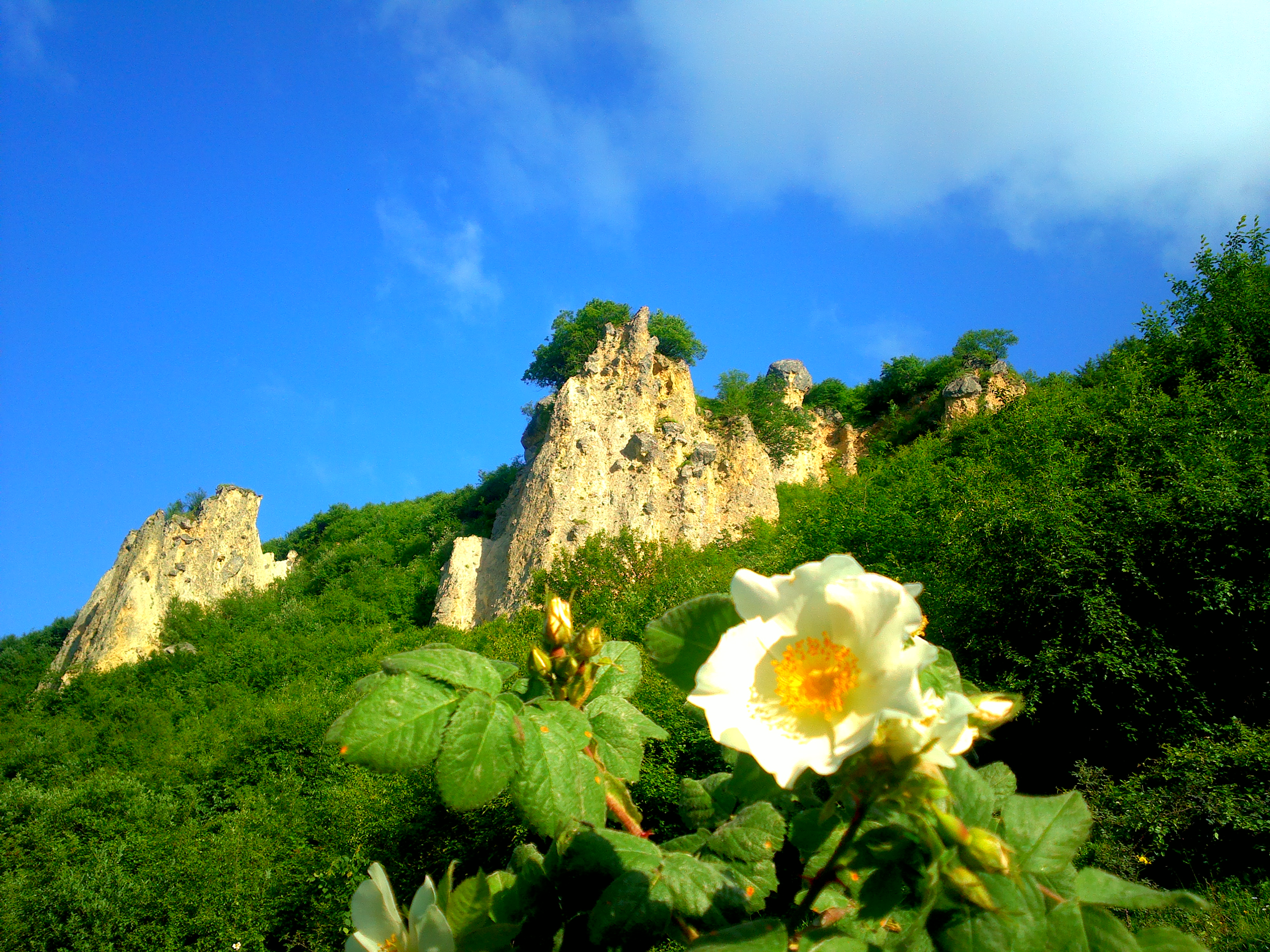

=== Fauna ===
The national park is home to the rare East Caucasian tur (Capra cylindricornis), a mountain dwelling goat antelope found only in the eastern half of the Caucasus Mountains. Other large mammals found here are the Caucasian chamois (Rupicapra rupicapra subsp. caucasica), Bezoar ibex (Capra aegagrus aegagrus), domestic goat (Capra hircus), Caucasian lynx (Lynx lynx dinniki), Syrian brown bear (Ursus arctos syriacus), wild boar (Sus scrofa), Indian wolf (Canis lupus pallipes), common jackal (Canis aureus aureus), common jungle cat (Felis chaus chaus), red fox (Vulpes vulpes), roe deer (Capreolus capreolus), badger (Meles meles), and otter (Lutra lutra), etc.

The Shahdag National Park and the eastern point of the Asiatic lion's range in the Trans-Caucasus Area and the Absheron Peninsula, before the end of the 10th century.

Reintroduction has been launched of the European bison, or wizent (a widely used Polish name for 'bison'), which were formerly extirpated from Azerbaijan. Reintroduction in the 1960s and 1970s was initially unsuccessful, as by 1977, all the reintroduced animals had perished. It was thought that the bison had consumed poisonous yew shoots and leaves, and subsequently died. Another attempt was launched in early 2026 with nine cows and three bulls.

== See also ==
- Nature of Azerbaijan
- National Parks of Azerbaijan
- State Reserves of Azerbaijan
- List of protected areas of Azerbaijan
