= Mount Bazardüzü =

Mountain in Russia and Azerbaijan

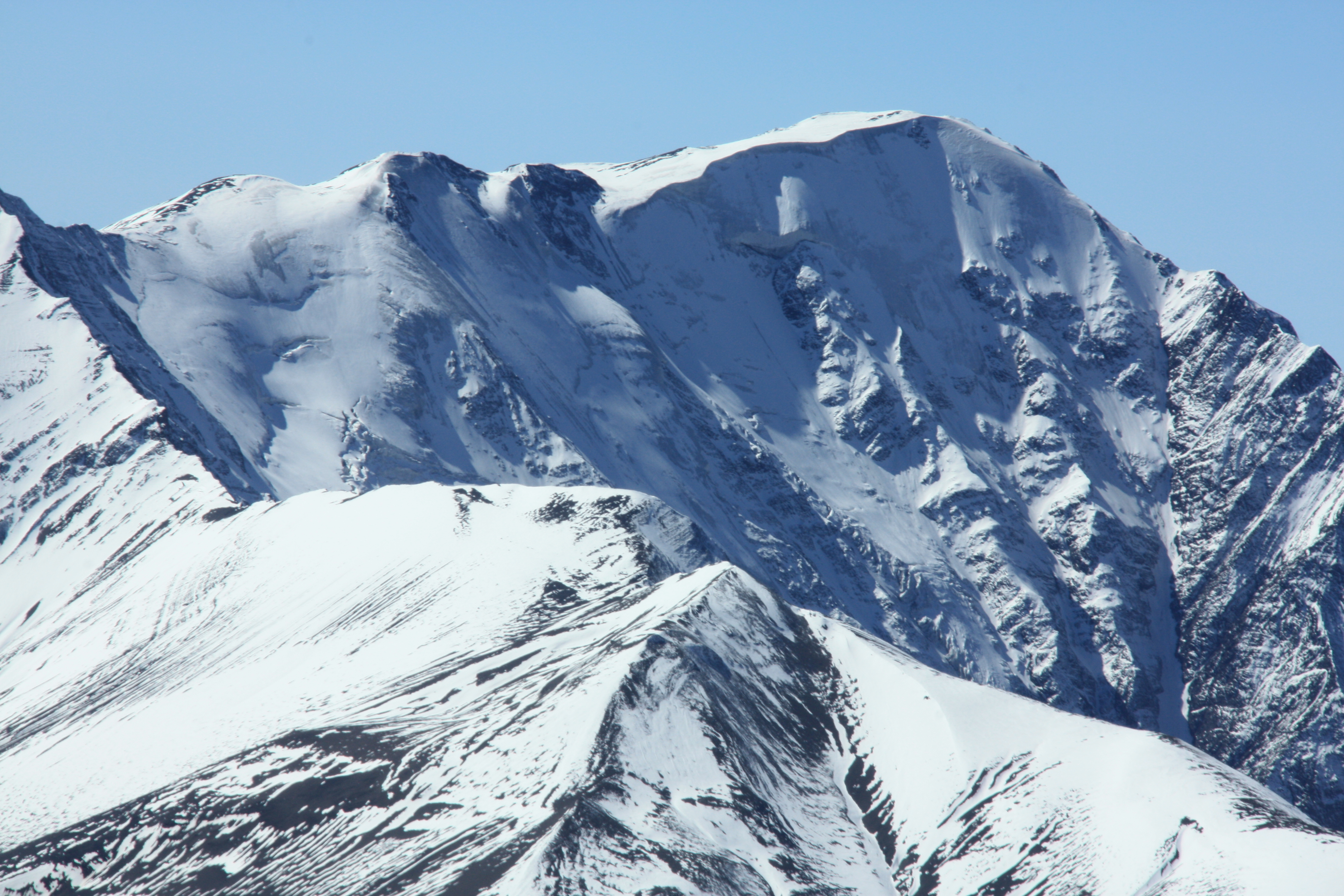
- Bazardüzü viewed from Shahdagh

Highest point
- Elevation: 4,466 m (14,652 ft)
- Prominence: 2,454 m (8,051 ft)
- Isolation: 259.08 km (160.98 mi)
- Listing: Highest points in Europe; Country high point Ultra, Ribu
- Coordinates: 41°13′28″N 47°51′30″E

Geography
- Location within Caucasus Mountains Location within Europe Location within Azerbaijan
- Location: Azerbaijan–Russia border
- Countries: Azerbaijan and Russian Federation
- Parent range: Main Caucasian Range; Greater Caucasus

Climbing
- First ascent: May 1849; Sergey Timofeevich Alexandrov

Mount Bazardüzü (Azerbaijani: Bazardüzü dağı, Azerbaijani pronunciation: [bɑzɑrdyˈzy]; Lezgian: Кичӏен сув [kiˈtʃʼe suv]; Russian: Базардюзю, Russian pronunciation: [bəzərdʲʉˈzʲu]) is a mountain peak in the Greater Caucasus range on the border between Azerbaijan and Russia (Dagestan). At 4,466 metres (14,652 ft) above sea level, it is the highest peak in both Azerbaijan and Dagestan, and is located in the Qusar region. The southernmost point of Dagestan (and therefore Russia) is located about seven kilometers southwest of the peak. Translated from Azerbaijani, Bazardüzü means “market square”, more precisely as a specific landmark - “turn to the market, bazaar”. In the Middle Ages in the Shahnabad Valley, located east of this peak, annual large multinational fairs were held.

== Climbing ==
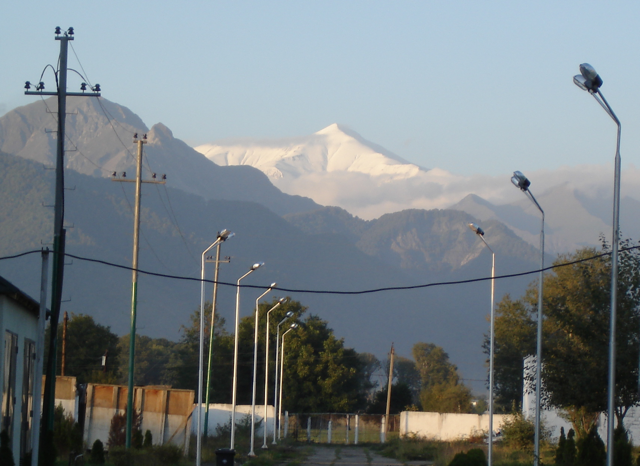
View of Mount Bazardüzü from Qabala, Azerbaijan

G. P. Baker and G. Yeld were the first men climbing the Mount in 1890 when the first ascent was recorded. Summer is considered the most appropriate period to climb the peak. There are two approaches to the Mount: one from the northeast and another from the southwest. In the northeast climbs can begin from the villages of Khinalug (Quba District) and Laza (Qusar District). The southwest approach starts from two villages in the center of the Qabala District: Laza (the same name as the village in Qusar) and Qəmərvan. The flood plain of the Yataqdərə river is the starting point of the summit at 2,800 metres (9,200 ft).

== See also ==
- List of the highest major summits of Azerbaijan
- Mount Guton
- List of European Ultras
- List of elevation extremes by country
- List of ultras of West Asia
