= Mount Shahdagh =

Mountain in northern Azerbaijan

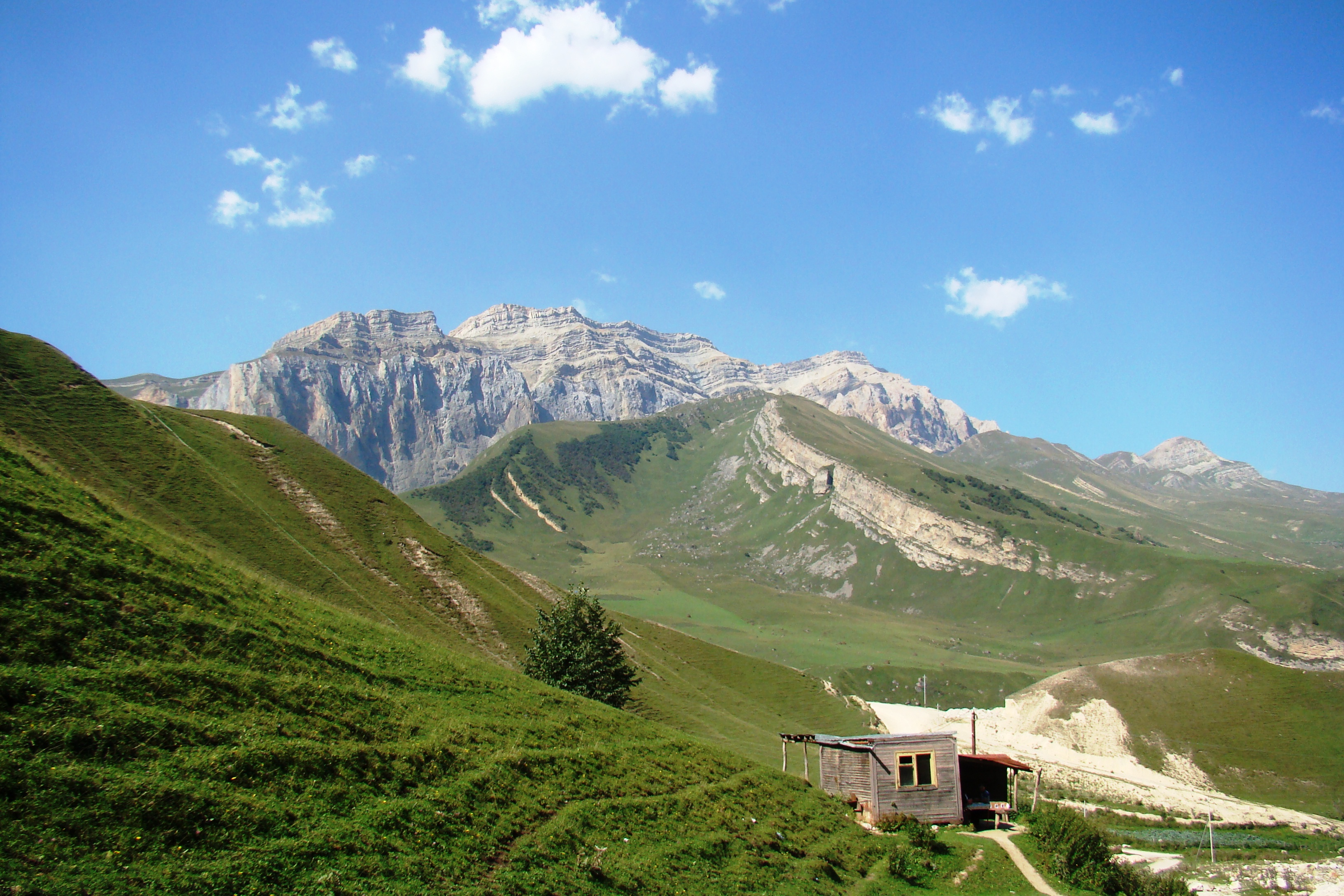

Highest point
- Elevation: 4,243 m (13,921 ft)
- Prominence: 1,097 m (3,599 ft)
- Isolation: 13.55 km (8.42 mi)
- Listing: Highest peaks of Azerbaijan
- Coordinates: 41°16′21″N 48°00′16″E

Geography
- Location within Azerbaijan Location within Caucasus Mountains Location within Europe
- Country: Azerbaijan
- District: Qusar
- Parent range: Lateral Range; Greater Caucasus

Mount Shahdagh (Azerbaijani: Şahdağ; Lezgian: Кас сув, romanized: Kas suv) is a mountain peak of the Greater Caucasus range, located in the Qusar District of Azerbaijan, close to the border with Russia (Dagestan). The elevation of the peak is 4,243 metres (13,921 ft) above sea level.

Among the earth rocks found at Shahdagh are magnesian lime, chalkstone and marble. Winter temperatures average -20°C.

It is famous for the Shahdagh National Park and Mountain Resort, right near the mountain.

== See also ==
- Bazardüzü
