= Dashkesan =

Dashkesan may refer to:

- Daşkəsən, a town in Azerbaijan
- Daşgəsən, a village in Azerbaijan
- Daşkəsən (settlement), a municipality in Azerbaijan
- Dashkasan District, a district in Azerbaijan
- Dashkasan (disambiguation), places in Iran
