= Mollahəsənli =

Mollahəsənli or Mollagasanli or Molla-Gasanly may refer to:

- Mollahəsənli, Dashkasan, Azerbaijan
- Molla Həsənli, Jabrayil, Azerbaijan
- Mollahəsənli, Masally, Azerbaijan
