= Qazaxlı =

Qazaxlı or Gazakhly may refer to:

- Qazaxlı, Dashkasan, Azerbaijan
- Qazaxlı, Samukh, Azerbaijan
