= Levakend =

- Location within Azerbaijan
- Coordinates: 40°33′N 46°04′E
- Country: Azerbaijan
- Rayon: Dashkasan

Population
  - Total: 9,493,600
- Time zone: UTC+4 (AZT)
  - Summer (DST): UTC+5 (AZT)
- Area code: 994

Levakend is a village in the Dashkasan Rayon of Azerbaijan. Levakend is approximately 3.2 km away from the capital of Dashkasan Rayon, Yukhary-Dashkesan in a straight line. It is also approximately 325 km west of Azerbaijan's capital, Baku in a straight line.
