= Zagaly =

Zagaly may refer to:

- Zağalı, Azerbaijan
- Zağaaltı, Azerbaijan
