= Almaly =

Almaly may refer to:

- Almaly, Azerbaijan, a village in Dashkasan District
- Almalı, Dashkasan, another village in Dashkasan District, in the municipality of Zinzahal, Azerbaijan
- Almalı, Khojali, Azerbaijan
- Almalı, Qakh, Azerbaijan
- Almaly (Almaty Metro), a railway station in Almaty, Kazakhstan
