= Dashkasan (disambiguation) =

Dashkasan is a cave complex.

Dashkasan may also refer to:

- Dashkasan Rayon, administrative district in Azerbaijan
- Daşkəsən, city in Azerbaijan
- Daşgəsən, settlement in Azerbaijan
- Dashkasan, Azarshahr, village in East Azerbaijan Province, Iran
- Dashkasan, Isfahan, village in Isfahan Province, Iran
- Dashkasan, Varzaqan, village in East Azerbaijan Province, Iran
