= Şahvələdli =

Şahvələdli or Shahveledli or Shahvaladli may refer to:

- Şahvələdli, Dashkasan, a village in the Dashkasan District of Azerbaijan
- Şahvələdli, Jabrayil, a village in the Jabrayil District of Azerbaijan
