= 2020 Nagorno-Karabakh ceasefire agreement =

Armistice agreement ending the Second Nagorno-Karabakh War

Statement by the President of the Republic of Azerbaijan, the Prime Minister of Armenia, and the President of the Russian Federation
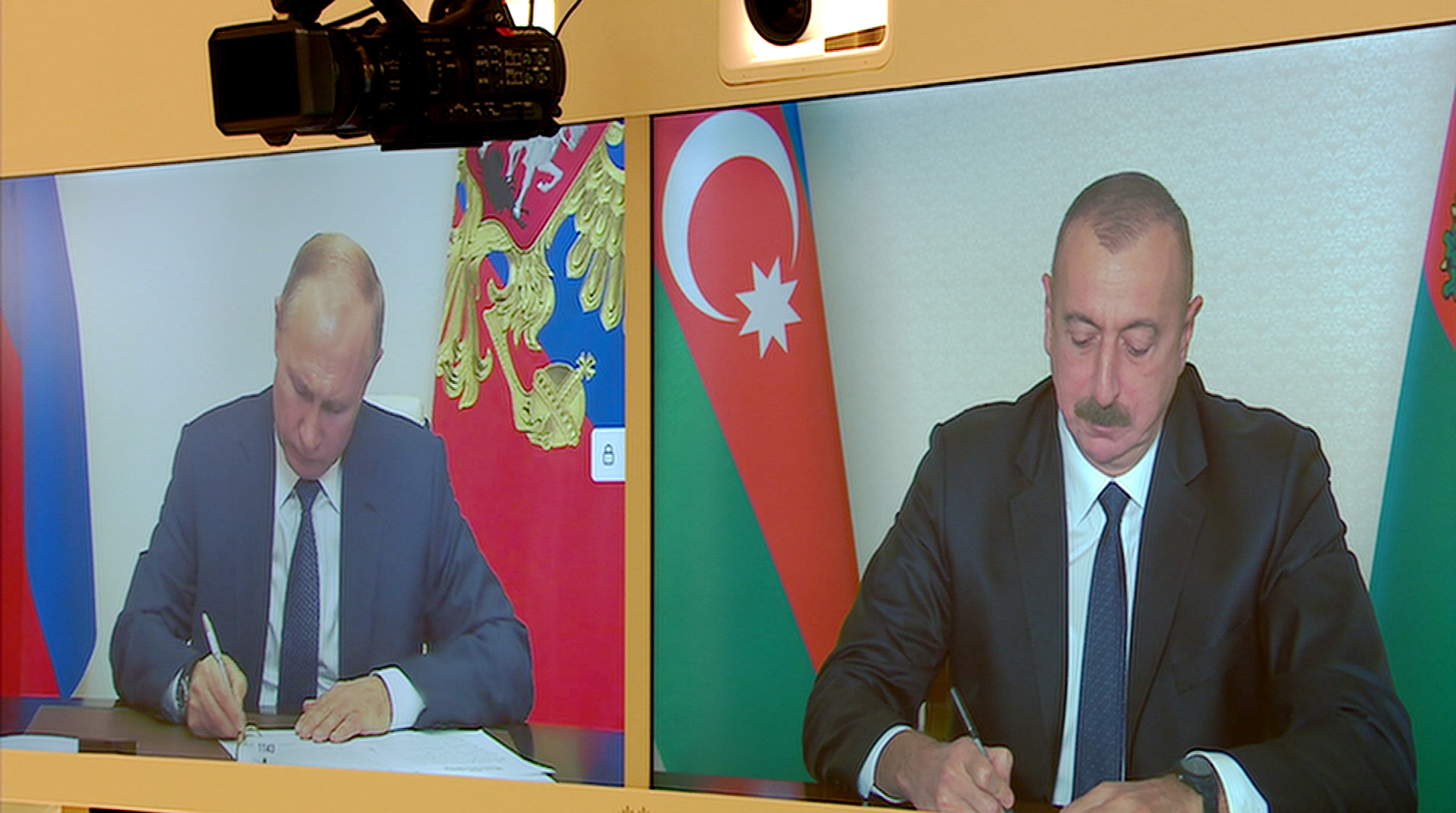
- Vladimir Putin and Ilham Aliyev signing the agreement via videoconference
- Type: Armistice
- Context: Second Nagorno-Karabakh War
- Signed: 9 November 2020
- Effective: 10 November 2020
- Mediators: Vladimir Putin
- Signatories: Ilham Aliyev; Nikol Pashinyan; Vladimir Putin

The 2020 Nagorno-Karabakh ceasefire agreement was an armistice agreement that ended the Second Nagorno-Karabakh War. It was signed on 9 November by the President of Azerbaijan Ilham Aliyev, the Prime Minister of Armenia Nikol Pashinyan and the President of Russia Vladimir Putin, and ended all hostilities in the Nagorno-Karabakh region from 00:00, on 10 November 2020 Moscow time. The president of the breakaway Republic of Artsakh, Arayik Harutyunyan, also agreed to an end of hostilities.

== Background ==
Renewed hostilities between Azerbaijan and Artsakh together with Armenia began on 27 September 2020. Azerbaijan captured many territories during the following six weeks which culminated in the capture of the strategically important town of Shusha and prompted the two sides to agree to a ceasefire deal on 9 November 2020.

== Overview ==
According to the agreement, both belligerent parties agreed to exchange prisoners of war and the dead. The Armenian forces were to withdraw from Armenian-occupied territories surrounding Nagorno-Karabakh by 1 December 2020. Armenia lost roughly 72% of the territories in and around Nagorno-Karabakh that it controlled prior to the war. An approximately 2,000-strong Russian peacekeeping force from the Russian Ground Forces was to be deployed to the region for a minimum of five years, one of its task being protection of the Lachin corridor, the only remaining passage between Armenia and Republic of Artsakh. Additionally, Armenia undertook to "guarantee safety" of transport links between mainland Azerbaijan and its Nakhchivan exclave. Russian FSB's Border Troops would exercise control over the transport connections.

== Terms of the agreement ==
Azerbaijan outside of the concerned area Armenia Areas recaptured by Azerbaijan, to stay under its control Agdam District: evacuated by Armenia by 20 November Kalbajar District: evacuated by Armenia by 25 November. Lachin District: evacuated by Armenia by 1 December Part of Nagorno-Karabakh remaining under the control of Artsakh Lachin corridor, with Russian peacekeepers The two access roads to Nagorno-Karabakh All economic and transport connections in the region to be unblocked, including transport connections between Nakhchivan and rest of Azerbaijan (arrow's hypothetical location chosen by a Wikipedia user, and not defined by the statement itself) Line of Contact before the 2020 conflict Other zones claimed by Artsakh

We, President of the Republic of Azerbaijan Ilham Aliyev, Prime Minister of Armenia Nikol Pashinyan and President of the Russian Federation Vladimir Putin, state the following:

1. A complete ceasefire and termination of all hostilities in the area of the Nagorno-Karabakh conflict is declared starting 12:00 am (midnight) Moscow time on 10 November 2020. The Republic of Azerbaijan and the Republic of Armenia, hereinafter referred to as the "Parties", shall stop in their current positions.

2. The Agdam District shall be returned to the Republic of Azerbaijan by 20 November 2020.

3. The peacemaking forces of the Russian Federation, namely, 1,960 troops armed with firearms, 90 armoured vehicles and 380 motor vehicles and units of special equipment, shall be deployed along the contact line in Nagorno-Karabakh and along the Lachin Corridor.

4. The peacemaking forces of the Russian Federation shall be deployed concurrently with the withdrawal of the Armenian troops. The peacemaking forces of the Russian Federation will be deployed for five years, a term to be automatically extended for subsequent five-year terms unless either Party notifies about its intention to terminate this clause six months before the expiration of the current term.

5. For more efficient monitoring of the Parties' fulfilment of the agreements, a peacemaking centre shall be established to oversee the ceasefire.

6. The Republic of Armenia shall return the Kalbajar District to the Republic of Azerbaijan by 15 November 2020, and the Lachin District by 1 December 2020. The Lachin Corridor (5 km wide), which will provide a connection between Nagorno-Karabakh and Armenia while not passing through the territory of Shusha, shall remain under the control of the Russian Federation peacemaking forces.

As agreed by the Parties, within the next three years, a plan will be outlined for the construction of a new route via the Lachin Corridor, to provide a connection between Nagorno-Karabakh and Armenia, and the Russian peacemaking forces shall be subsequently relocated to protect the route.

The Republic of Azerbaijan shall guarantee the security of persons, vehicles and cargo moving along the Lachin Corridor in both directions.

7. Internally displaced persons and refugees shall return to the territory of Nagorno-Karabakh and adjacent areas under the supervision of the United Nations High Commissioner for Refugees.

8. The Parties shall exchange prisoners of war, hostages and other detained persons, and dead bodies.

9. All economic and transport connections in the region shall be unblocked. The Republic of Armenia shall guarantee the security of transport connections between the western regions of the Republic of Azerbaijan and the Nakhchivan Autonomous Republic in order to arrange unobstructed movement of persons, vehicles and cargo in both directions. The Border Guard Service of the Russian Federal Security Service shall be responsible for overseeing the transport connections.

Subject to agreement between the Parties, the construction of new transport communications to link the Nakhchivan Autonomous Republic with the western regions of Azerbaijan will be ensured.

— President of the Republic of Azerbaijan Ilham Aliyev, Prime Minister of Armenia Nikol Pashinyan and President of the Russian Federation Vladimir Putin, "The Statement by the President of the Republic of Azerbaijan, Prime Minister of the Republic of Armenia and President of the Russian Federation", published on Kremlin website

== Reactions ==
=== Armenia ===
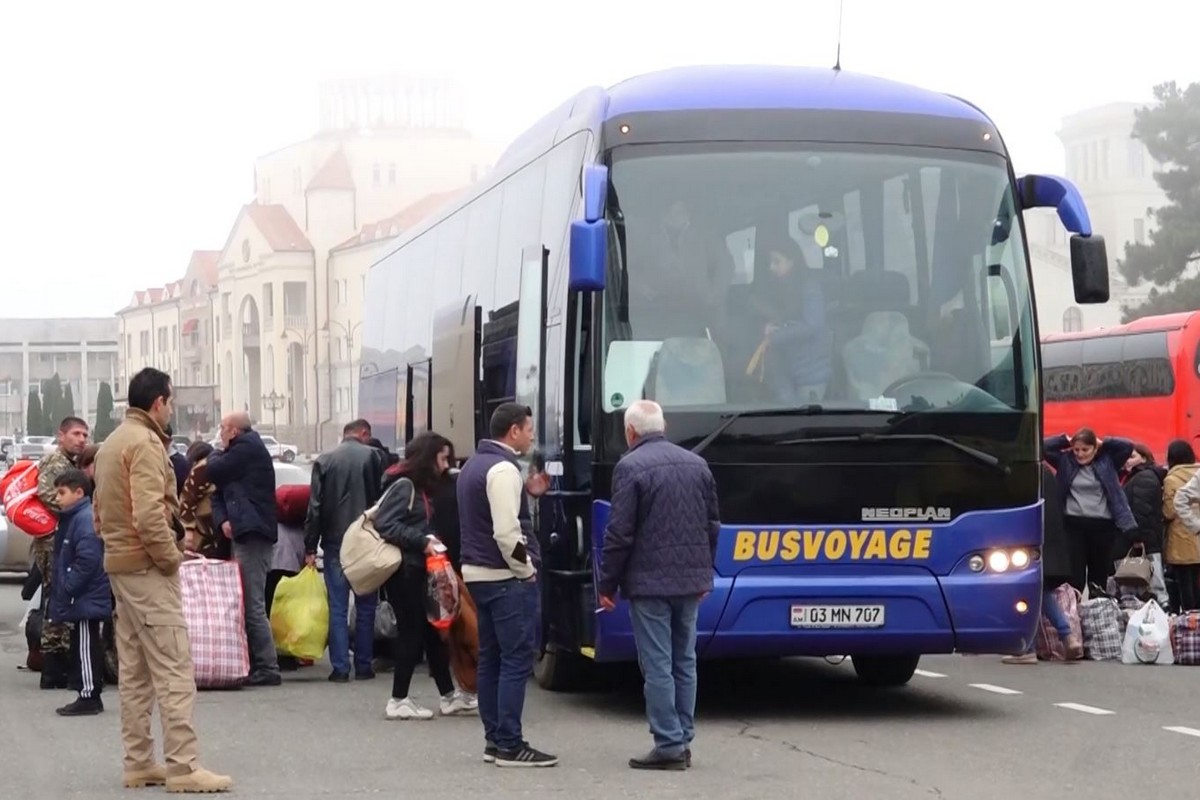
Armenians returning to Stepanakert after the ceasefire agreement

After signing the agreement, Prime Minister of Armenia Nikol Pashinyan said, "This is not a victory, but there is not defeat until you consider yourself defeated, we will never consider ourselves defeated and this shall become a new start of an era of our national unity and rebirth." Violent protests erupted in Yerevan following the announcement of the ceasefire agreement. The speaker of the Parliament of Armenia, Ararat Mirzoyan, was beaten by an angry mob who stormed the Parliament after the peace deal was announced. Pashinyan indicated, however, that Mirzoyan's life was "not under threat" and he had undergone surgery.

=== Azerbaijan ===
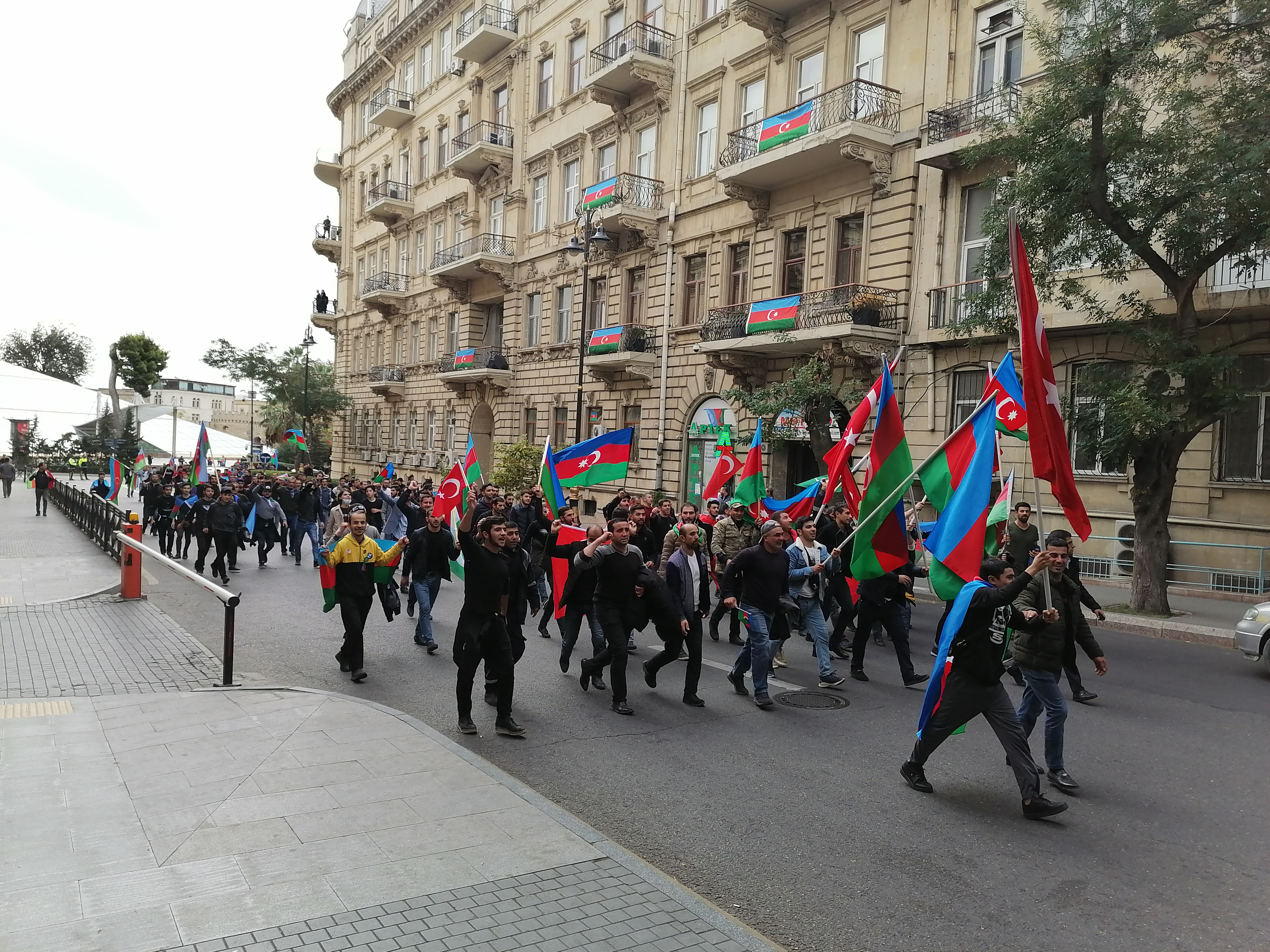
Celebrations in Baku after the agreement

The President of Azerbaijan Ilham Aliyev reacted to the agreement by saying, "This statement constitutes Armenia's capitulation. This statement puts an end to the years-long occupation." During his speech, Aliyev mockingly said Nə oldu Paşinyan? ("What happened Pashinyan?"), which became an Internet meme in Azerbaijan and Turkey. Large-scale celebrations erupted throughout Azerbaijan, most notably in its capital city of Baku when news of the agreement was announced.

=== International ===
==== Countries ====
- France said the cessation of hostilities was crucial, urged Azerbaijan to abide by the terms of the agreement and affirmed its friendship with Armenia.
- The president of Georgia, Salome Zurabishvili, congratulated Armenia and Azerbaijan for agreeing to end hostilities, offered condolences to the families of victims of the war and hoped a new era will start in the South Caucasus.
- Iran welcomed the agreement and hoped it will lead to a final settlement which will preserve peace in the region.
- Moldova's Ministry of Foreign Affairs and European Integration communicated that the country welcomed the accords with satisfaction and that Moldova supported the search of a lasting peaceful solution in the region based on international norms and principles.
- The Pakistani foreign minister issued a statement saying "We congratulate the government and brotherly people of Azerbaijan on the liberation of their territories."
- Russian President Vladimir Putin said, "We presume that the agreements reached will set up necessary conditions for the lasting and full-format settling of the Nagorno-Karabakh crisis on the basis of justice and to the benefit of Armenian and Azerbaijan peoples."
- Turkish Foreign minister Mevlüt Çavuşoğlu congratulated Azerbaijan following the signing of the agreement.
- The United Kingdom's Foreign Secretary Dominic Raab welcomed the agreement and encouraged both sides to continue to work towards a lasting settlement to the dispute.

==== Organizations ====
- The European Union welcomed cessation of hostilities and hoped continued negotiations would lead to a sustainable settlement.
- The Secretary-General of the Turkic Council congratulated Azerbaijan for its "historical achievement of liberation of its occupied territories and restoring sovereignty over them".
- A spokesperson for United Nations Secretary-General Antonio Guterres said, "The Secretary-General is relieved that the deal has been agreed to on the cessation of hostilities. Our consistent focus has been on the well-being of civilians, on humanitarian access, and on protecting lives, and we hope that this will now be achieved consistent with the previous important efforts of the Minsk [Group] Co-Chairs."

== Aftermath ==
=== Armenian evacuation ===
External videos
- Nagorno-Karabakh: The families burning down their own homes on YouTube

Since 13 November 2020, Armenians in Kalbajar, a district that was mostly inhabited by ethnic Azerbaijanis before the First Nagorno-Karabakh War and was settled by Armenian citizens after it, started to burn their homes and cut trees before leaving for Armenia, to avoid them being reinhabited by the Azerbaijanis. Some Armenians also took their dead relatives' remains with them, while others were carting off everything they could as trucks nearby loaded up with household possessions and cut down trees. Agence France-Presse reported that in Charektar, at least six houses were set on fire. On 15 November, at Armenia's request, Azerbaijan extended the deadline for Armenians to fully vacate Kalbajar District by 10 days, until 25 November. Azerbaijan's Presidential Office stated that they took the worsening weather and the fact that there was only one road to Armenia into consideration when agreeing to extend the deadline. Azerbaijani authorities also denounced civilians and de-mobilized soldiers leaving the area for burning houses and committing what they called "ecological terror".

=== Deployment of Russian peacekeepers ===
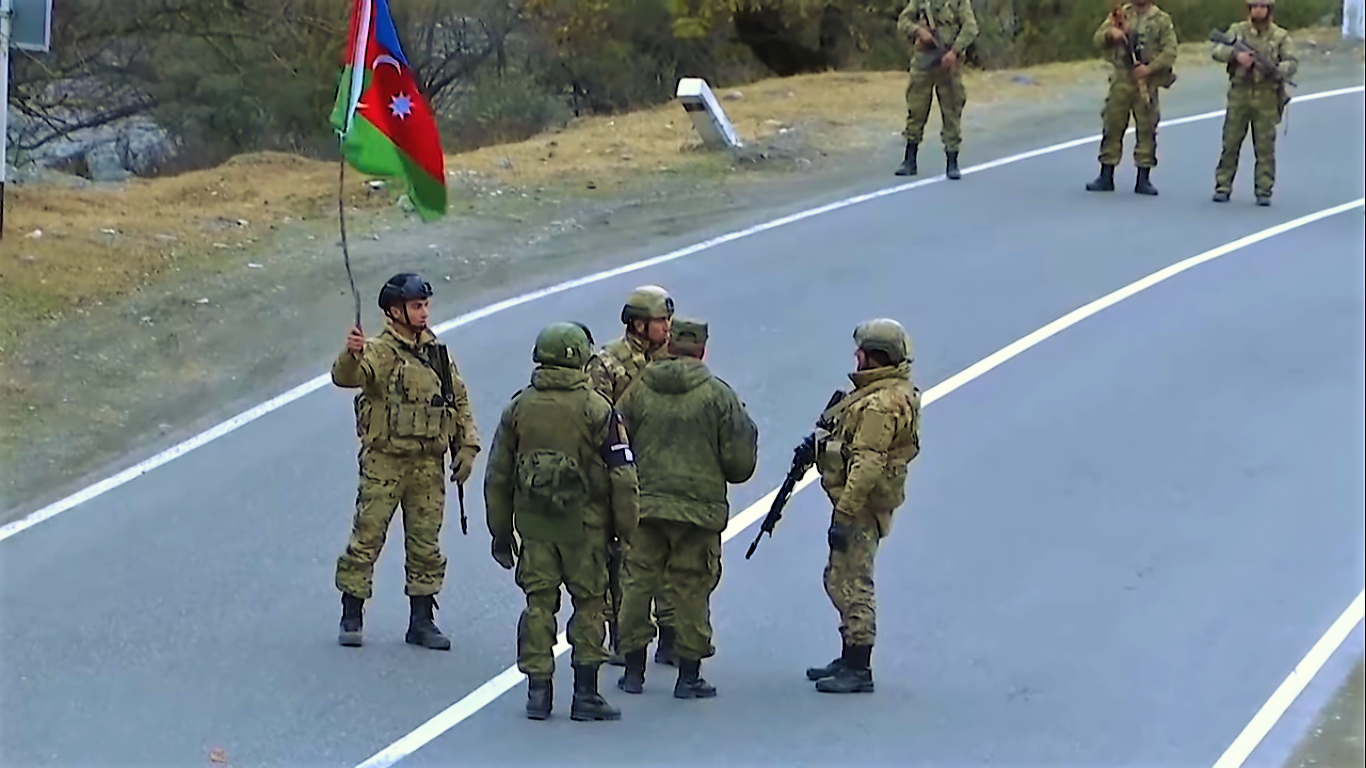
Russian peacekeepers and Azerbaijani military personnel near Dadivank of Kalbajar District.

As early as on 10 November 2020, Russian troops and armour that were to constitute a peacekeeping force under the agreement, were reported to be moving into in the region of Nagorno-Karabakh. The force was reported to have been transported to Armenia by air before the agreement was signed. By 12 November, the Russian force consisted mostly of the personnel of the 15th Separate Motor Rifle Brigade had entered Stepanakert and begun deploying observation posts across the region.

=== Exchange of POWs and detainees ===
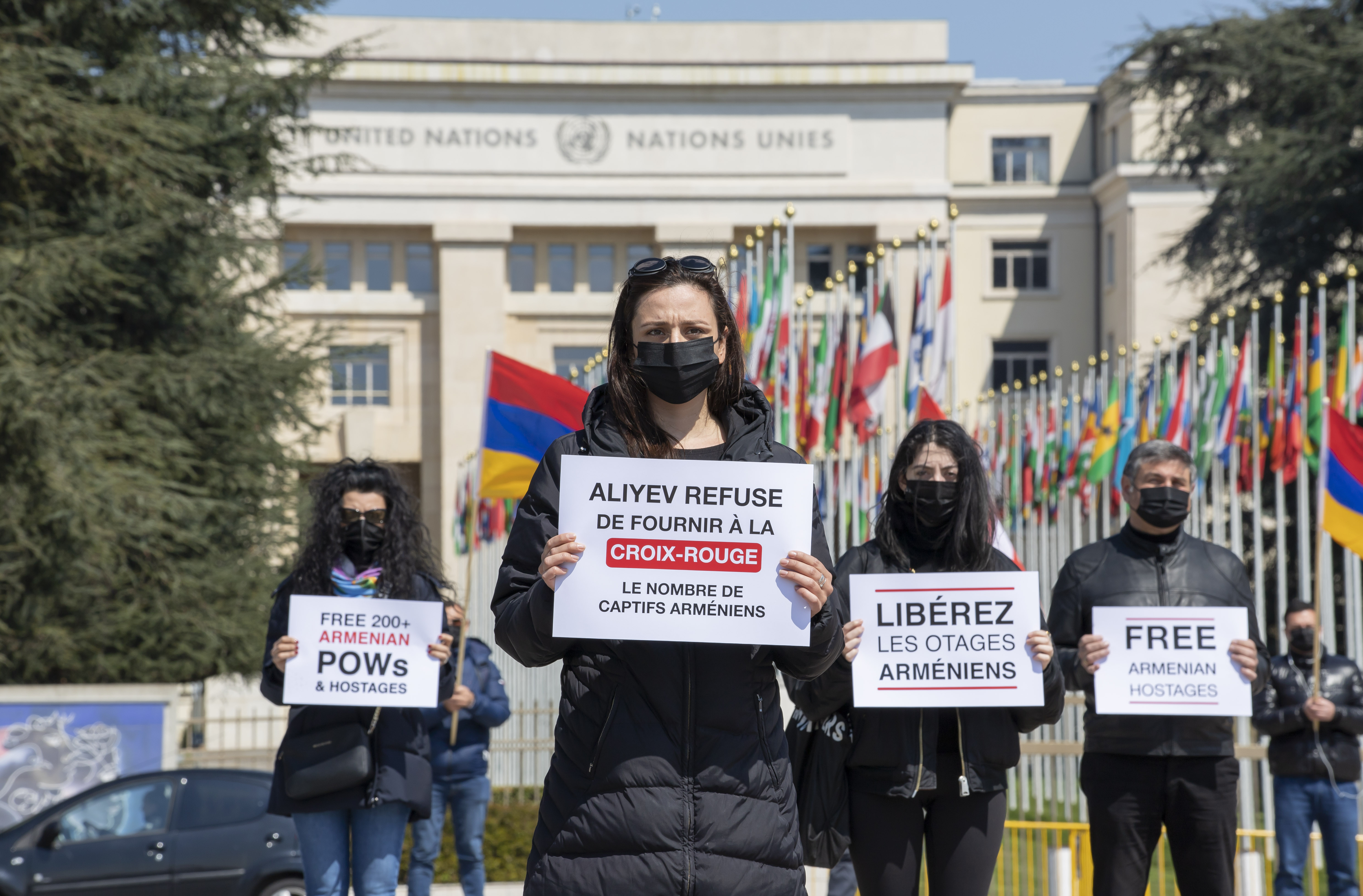
Protesters in Geneva demanding the release of Armenian POWs, 15 April 2021

In December 2020, Armenia and Azerbaijan began exchanging groups of prisoners of war mediated by Russia. As of February 2021, 63 prisoners, including civilians, returned to Armenia, and 15 were returned to Azerbaijan. In March 2021, Human Rights Watch (HRW), reported that Azerbaijan had repatriated 69 POWs.

After the ceasefire, following skirmishes in mid-December 2020, Azerbaijan detained a group of 62 Armenian soldiers. Azerbaijani authorities claimed that the soldiers are not POWs but members of a "sabotage group", and criminal charges would be brought against them. However, European Parliament resolution concluded that credible reports had surfaced of Armenian service personnel and civilians being been kidnapped since the cease-fire on 10 November, and that Azerbaijani forces detained civilians despite the lack of evidence that they posed a security threat that could justify their detention under international humanitarian law. Notably, Maral Najaryan, a recent Lebanese-Armenian emigrant to Shushi in Nagorno-Karabakh who went missing in the last days of the war, was among the detainees. Ani Najaryan, Najaryan's sister, told Radio Free Europe that she had moved to Karabakh after Beirut's massive explosion. Her Lebanese ancestry has been used by the Azerbaijani media to suggest that she was a "mercenary" fighting for the Armenians.

On 14 April 2021, a global campaign was launched among the Armenian diaspora to demand the release of Armenian POWs and other detainees held in Azerbaijan. Protests were held in 14 cities around the world, including Toronto, Paris, Rome, Houston, Sacramento, Montréal, New York, Los Angeles, Warsaw, Berlin, Hamburg and Moscow. According to Armenian authorities, as of April 2021, over 200 Armenian POWs were being held captive by Azerbaijan. On 20 May 2021, the European Parliament adopted a resolution urging Azerbaijan to immediately and unconditionally release all the Armenian prisoners, both military and civilian, detained during or after the conflict. In June the Armenian substitute member of the Parliamentary Assembly of the Council of Europe (PACE) Tatevik Hayrapetyan raised concern of the situation of the Armenian POWs in the PACE, as in a discussion between the Ilham Aliyev and Emine Erdoğan, the first lady of Turkey where both appeared to be pleased by the fact that there exist Armenian POWs and the latter suggested a release of them in several stages. On 22 July 2021, 13 Armenian servicemen were sentenced to 6 years imprisonment and charged with "terrorism" and "illegally entering Azerbaijan".

On 22 September 2021, the U.S. House of Representatives passed the Amendment, demanding Azerbaijan's immediate release of about 200 Armenian POWs, hostages and detained persons, "misrepresenting their status in an attempt to justify their continued captivity".

Human Rights Watch reported that Azerbaijani armed forces mistreated Armenian POWs, subjecting them to physical abuse and humiliation. "The abuse, including torture of detained Armenian soldiers, is abhorrent and a war crime", said Hugh Williamson, Europe and Central Asia director at Human Rights Watch. "It is also deeply disturbing that a number of missing Armenian soldiers were last seen in Azerbaijan’s custody and it has failed to account for them".

=== Russian–Turkish monitoring centre ===
Following the signing of the agreement and the deployment of the Russian peacekeepers, a memorandum on establishing a joint Russian–Turkish monitoring centre in Azerbaijan was signed by Russian and Turkish defence ministers. Russia, however, insisted that Turkey's involvement would be limited to operating remotely from the monitoring centre on Azerbaijani soil outside of Nagorno-Karabakh, and that Turkish peacekeepers would not go to Nagorno-Karabakh.

=== Unblocking transport connections ===
As of late 2021, the fate of the "transport connections" the article 9 of the ceasefire agreement provisioned is still uncertain. A working group on unblocking communications led by deputy prime ministers of Azerbaijan, Armenia, and Russia was established in January 2021, but no significant progress has been made. Although not discussed in the trilateral negotiations, Azerbaijan has kept insisting on its plans of implementing "Zangezur corridor", which would entail a transport corridor connecting Nakhchivan to the rest of Azerbaijan via Armenia's Syunik Province. Analytics pointed out that Azerbaijan's ambitions are aimed at creating a geopolitical corridor under the pretext of regional connectivity. In May 2021, Pashinyan said that while Armenia is keen on opening transport links as means of direct railway communication with Iran and Russia, it is not willing to discuss any 'corridor logic'. The dispute has been cited as one of the reasons for the 2021 Armenia–Azerbaijan border crisis. In September, Russian deputy prime minister Alexei Overchuk insisted that the trilateral group has not discussed "corridors". In October 2021, Azerbaijan unilaterally began using Armenia's airspace, conducting flights to its Nakhchivan exclave.

A new round of Russian-mediated negotiations on restoring economic links between their countries began between Armenia and Azerbaijani deputy prime ministers on 20 October, where legal aspects of opening the Armenian-Azerbaijani border for commercial traffic were discussed. The sides have made progress towards restoring their Soviet-era rail links according to Armenian deputy prime minister. On 5 November 2021, Russian vice prime minister Alexey Overchuk and Russian Ministry of Foreign Affairs announced that the routes created after unblocking all the regional communications between Armenia and Azerbaijan will be under jurisdiction of the country the territory of which they cross pass through.

Nikol Pashinyan and Ilham Aliyev met in Brussels on 15 December 2021 and discussed unblocking regional communications among other issues. The meeting was arranged and moderated by the President of European Council Charles Michel, who after the meeting stated that the leaders of Armenia and Azerbaijan managed to come to agreement regarding opening the rail routes, but not automobile roads. After the meeting Pashinyan and Aliyev confirmed the agreement on the restoration of the railway communication. "The railway will operate in accordance with internationally recognized border and customs regulations on a reciprocal basis under the sovereignty and jurisdiction of the countries. Armenia will have access by rail to the Islamic Republic of Iran and the Russian Federation" the press service of Prime Minister of Armenia reported after the meeting.

=== Follow-up statements ===
The leaders of Armenia, Azerbaijan and Russia met twice in 2021, issuing statements to confirm continued adherence to the 2020 ceasefire agreement and to elaborate on its implementation.

The joint trilateral statement issued in Moscow on 11 January 2021 stated:

"We, the President of the Republic of Azerbaijan Ilham Aliyev, the Prime Minister of the Republic of Armenia Nikol Pashinyan and the President of the Russian Federation Vladimir Putin declare the following:

1. With a view to implementing Paragraph 9 of the November 9, 2020 Statement in terms of unblocking all economic and transport links in the region, we are hereby endorsing the proposal made by RF President Vladimir Putin on setting up a tripartite working group under the joint chairmanship of the Deputy Prime Minister of the Republic of Azerbaijan, the Deputy Prime Minister of the Republic of Armenia and the Deputy Chairman of the RF Government.

2. The Working Group will hold its first meeting by January 30, 2021, according to the results of which it will draw up a list of primary tasks arising from the implementation of the aforementioned Paragraph 9 of the Statement. The priorities shall include rail and road communications, as well as the identification of other directions as agreed upon by the Republic of Azerbaijan, the Republic of Armenia and the Russian Federation, hereinafter referred to as the Parties.

3. In order to implement the primary directions, the Working Group’s co-chairs will approve the composition of expert subgroups in these areas from among the officials of the competent authorities and organizations of the Parties. Within a month after the Working Group’s meeting, the expert subgroups will submit a list of projects, which should specify the necessary resources and activities for their implementation and approval at the highest level by the Parties.

4. By March 1, 2021, the Working Group shall submit for the Parties’ approval at the highest level a list and timetable of activities to restore or build new transport infrastructure necessary for initiating, implementing and providing for the safety of international traffic through the Republic of Azerbaijan and the Republic of Armenia, as well as ensuring the safety of transportations carried out by the Republic of Azerbaijan and the Republic of Armenia through the territories of the Republic of Azerbaijan and the Republic of Armenia.”

— Republic of Armenia Prime Minister Nikol Pashinyan, Russian Federation President Vladimir Putin and Republic of Azerbaijan President Ilham Aliyev., Joint statement issued 11 January 2021 following a meeting in Moscow between the President of the Republic of Azerbaijan Ilham Aliyev, the Prime Minister of the Republic of Armenia Nikol Pashinyan and the President of the Russian Federation Vladimir Putin., https://www.primeminister.am/en/press-release/item/2021/01/11/Nikol-Pashinyan-Moscow-meeting-Announcement/

The joint trilateral statement issued in Sochi on 26 November 2021 stated:

“We, the Prime Minister of the Republic of Armenia N.V.Pashinyan, the President of the Republic of Azerbaijan I.H. Aliyev, President of the Russian Federation V.V.Putin, met on November 26 in Sochi and discussed the implementation process of the declaration of November 9, 2020 on the complete ceasefire and termination of all types of military operations in the Nagorno-Karabakh conflict zone and the implementation process of the January 11, 2021 statement on unblocking all economic and transport infrastructures of the region.

We reaffirmed commitment to the further and consistent implementation and unconditional observance of all the provisions of the November 9, 2020 declaration and January 11, 2021 statement for the benefit of the stability, security and economic development of the South Caucasus. We agreed to intensify joint efforts aimed at the immediate solution of the remaining issues arising from November 9, 2020 and January 11, 2021 statements.

We mentioned the significant contribution of the Russian peacekeeping mission in stabilizing the situation and ensuring security in the region.

We agreed to take steps to increase the level of stability and security on the Azerbaijani-Armenian border, to push the process of establishment of a bilateral commission with the advisory participation of the Russian Federation based on the application of the sides, on delimitation, and afterwards demarcation, of the state border between the Republic of Armenia and the Republic of Azerbaijan.

We highly appreciated the activity of the trilateral working group on unblocking all economic and transport communications of the region, established in accordance with the January 11, 2021 statement under the joint chairmanship of the Deputy Prime Ministers of the Republic of Azerbaijan, the Republic of Armenia and the Russian Federation. We stressed the need to launch specific programs as soon as possible, aimed at identifying the economic potential of the region.

The Russian Federation will continue to provide the necessary assistance for normalizing relations between the Republic of Azerbaijan and the Republic of Armenia, building an atmosphere of trust between the Azerbaijani and Armenian peoples, and establishing good-neighborly relations in the region."

— Prime Minister of the Republic of Armenia Nikol Pashinyan, the President of the Republic of Azerbaijan Ilham Aliyev, President of the Russian Federation Vladimir Putin, Joint statement of Armenian Prime Minister, Russian President, Azerbaijani President adopted 26.11.2021 in Sochi, https://www.primeminister.am/en/press-release/item/2021/11/26/Nikol-Pashinyan-Sochi/

=== "3 + 3 platform" ===
After the end of the war, Turkey and Azerbaijan proposed "3+3", a platform for collaboration between the three South Caucasian countries (Azerbaijan, Armenia and Georgia) and the three regional powers (Turkey, Russia and Iran). The first consultative meeting of the platform, which was attended by the countries' deputy foreign ministers, took place on 10 December 2021. Georgia, also invited, declined to participate, citing the Russian occupation of South Ossetia and Abkhazia as a reason. Armenia announced that it was willing to participate only if the questions at stake were not already agreed on or discussed in other formats, including the issue of Nagorno-Karabakh.

== See also ==
- 2023 Nagorno-Karabakh ceasefire agreement
- Armenia–Azerbaijan peace agreement
