= Rəsullu =

Rəsullu or Rassuli or Rassuly may refer to:

- Rəsullu, Dashkasan, Azerbaijan
- Rəsullu, Imishli, Azerbaijan
