= Almalı =

Almalı or Almali may refer to:

- Almalı, Dashkasan, Azerbaijan
- Almalı, Khojali, Azerbaijan
- Almalı, Qakh, Azerbaijan
- Almali, Zanjan, Iran
