= Yolqullar =

- Location within Azerbaijan
- Coordinates: 40°24′57″N 46°08′04″E
- Country: Azerbaijan
- Rayon: Dashkasan
- Municipality: Zinzahal
- Time zone: UTC+4 (AZT)
  - Summer (DST): UTC+5 (AZT)

Yolqullar (also, Yëlkullar) is a village in the Dashkasan Rayon of Azerbaijan and forms part of the municipality of Zinzahal.
