= Qıyıqlı =

- Municipality
- Location within Azerbaijan
- Coordinates: 40°28′N 46°12′E
- Country: Azerbaijan
- Rayon: Dashkasan

Population
  - Total: 340
- Time zone: UTC+4 (AZT)
  - Summer (DST): UTC+5 (AZT)

Qıyıqlı (also, Qıyıxlı, Gyyykhly, and Kyyykhly) is a village and municipality in the Dashkasan Rayon district of Azerbaijan. It has a population of 340.
