= Hinaldagh =

Mountain in Azerbaijan

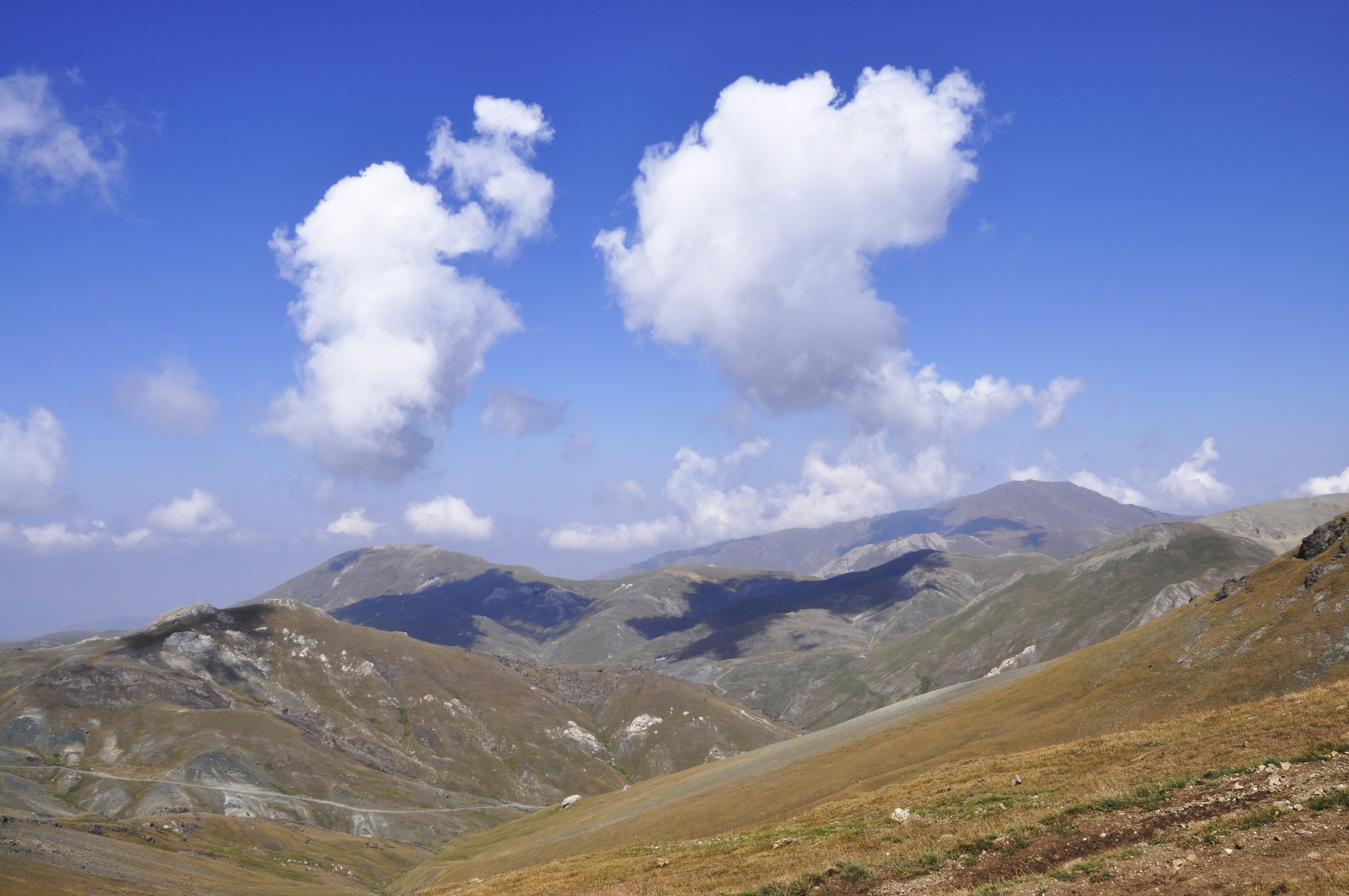

Highest point
- Elevation: 3,367 m (11,047 ft)
- Coordinates: 40°17′26.8″N 45°59′40.6″E

Geography
- Location within Caucasus Mountains Location within Azerbaijan
- Location: Dashkasan District
- Country: Azerbaijan
- Parent range: Lesser Caucasus

Hinaldagh (Azerbaijani: Hinaldağ) is a mountain in the Dashkasan District of Azerbaijan. It's located in the western part of the Tanriyokhush, the source section of the Levchay, Shamkir and Ganja rivers. It used to be the de facto 'Line of Contact' between Azerbaijan and self-proclaimed Republic of Artsakh following the First Nagorno-Karabakh war, however, Azerbaijan gained full control over it on 25 November 2021 per the 2020 Nagorno-Karabakh ceasefire agreement. There are alpine and subalpine meadows. Its height is 3367 meters.

== See also ==
- List of the highest major summits of Azerbaijan
