= Qazaxyolçular =

- Municipality
- Location within Azerbaijan
- Coordinates: 40°27′N 46°05′E
- Country: Azerbaijan
- Rayon: Dashkasan

Population
  - Total: 346
- Time zone: UTC+4 (AZT)
  - Summer (DST): UTC+5 (AZT)

Qazaxyolçular (also, Kazakhëlchular) is a village and municipality in the Dashkasan Rayon of Azerbaijan. It has a population of 346.
