= Citizen A =

- Genre: drama
- Written by: Asiman Agha Rovshan
- Directed by: Elvin Rustamzade
- Starring: Gurban Ismayilov; Gunesh Mehdizade
- No. of seasons: 1
- No. of episodes: 12

Production
- Producer: Sevinj Aliyeva
- Production location: Bayan, Dashkasan
- Production company: SFN Film

Original release
- Network: İTV
- Release: 21 September – 7 December 2024

Citizen A (Azerbaijani: Vətəndaş A) is a 2024 Azerbaijani drama television series directed by Elvin Rustamzade and written by Asiman Agha Rovshan. It is based on the playwright "Almaz" by Jafar Jabbarly. The series gained wide popularity in Azerbaijan.

== Plot ==
The television series attempts to highlight the identity of a citizen, the process of forming this identity in the image of society, the decisive importance of education in forming the identity of a citizen. The main character of the film, Almaz (Gunesh Mehdizade), is a history teacher sent to work at a school in the remote mountain village of Abdalbeyli from Baku. Arriving in the village, Almaz fights for lawlessness, tyranny and women's rights at school and in the whole village.

== Production ==
The television series was produced by SFN Film. The script for the series was written by Asiman Aga Rovshan, influenced by Jafar Jabbarly's playwright "Almaz". However, the script is completely different from the play in terms of plot, characters and dialogues. "Citizen A" by producer Sevinj Aliyeva was shown in 2024 by director Elvin Rustamzade.

The filming of the series began in 2023 and ended in January 2024. The first episodes of the series were aired on May 19, 2024. Filming took place in the village of Bayan in the Dashkesen region, in the cities of Shamakhi and Baku. In the first part of the script, the bus scene in which Almaz arrives in the region was filmed in three regions - Shamakhi, Lahij and Dashkasan.
