= Gəlinqaya =

Coordinates: 40°29′N 45°53′E

Gəlinqaya is a village in the municipality of Qabaqtəpə in the Dashkasan Rayon of Azerbaijan.
