= Kollu, Dashkasan =

Kollu
- Location within Azerbaijan
- Coordinates: 40°25′49″N 46°12′16″E
- Country: Azerbaijan
- Rayon: Dashkasan
- Municipality: Zinzahal
- Time zone: UTC+4 (AZT)
  - Summer (DST): UTC+5 (AZT)

Kollu or Kelly is a very small village in the Dashkasan Rayon of Azerbaijan. The village forms part of the municipality of Zinzahal.
