= Pirverdilər =

Village and municipality in Dashkasan Rayon, Azerbaijan

Coordinates: 40°28′N 45°54′E

Pirverdilər is a village and municipality in the Dashkasan Rayon of Azerbaijan. It has a population of 924.
