= Kabakhtapa =

Kabakhtapa may refer to:

- Ghabaghtapa, Armenia
- Kabagtepe, Azerbaijan
- Qabaqtəpə, Azerbaijan
