= Astaf =

- Municipality
- Location within Azerbaijan
- Coordinates: 40°27′57″N 45°51′54″E
- Country: Azerbaijan
- Rayon: Dashkasan

Population
  - Total: 361
- Time zone: UTC+4 (AZT)
  - Summer (DST): UTC+5 (AZT)

Astaf is a village and municipality in the Dashkasan Rayon of Azerbaijan. It has a population of 361.
