= Bayan, Dashkasan =

Bayan Բանանց • Banants
- Municipality
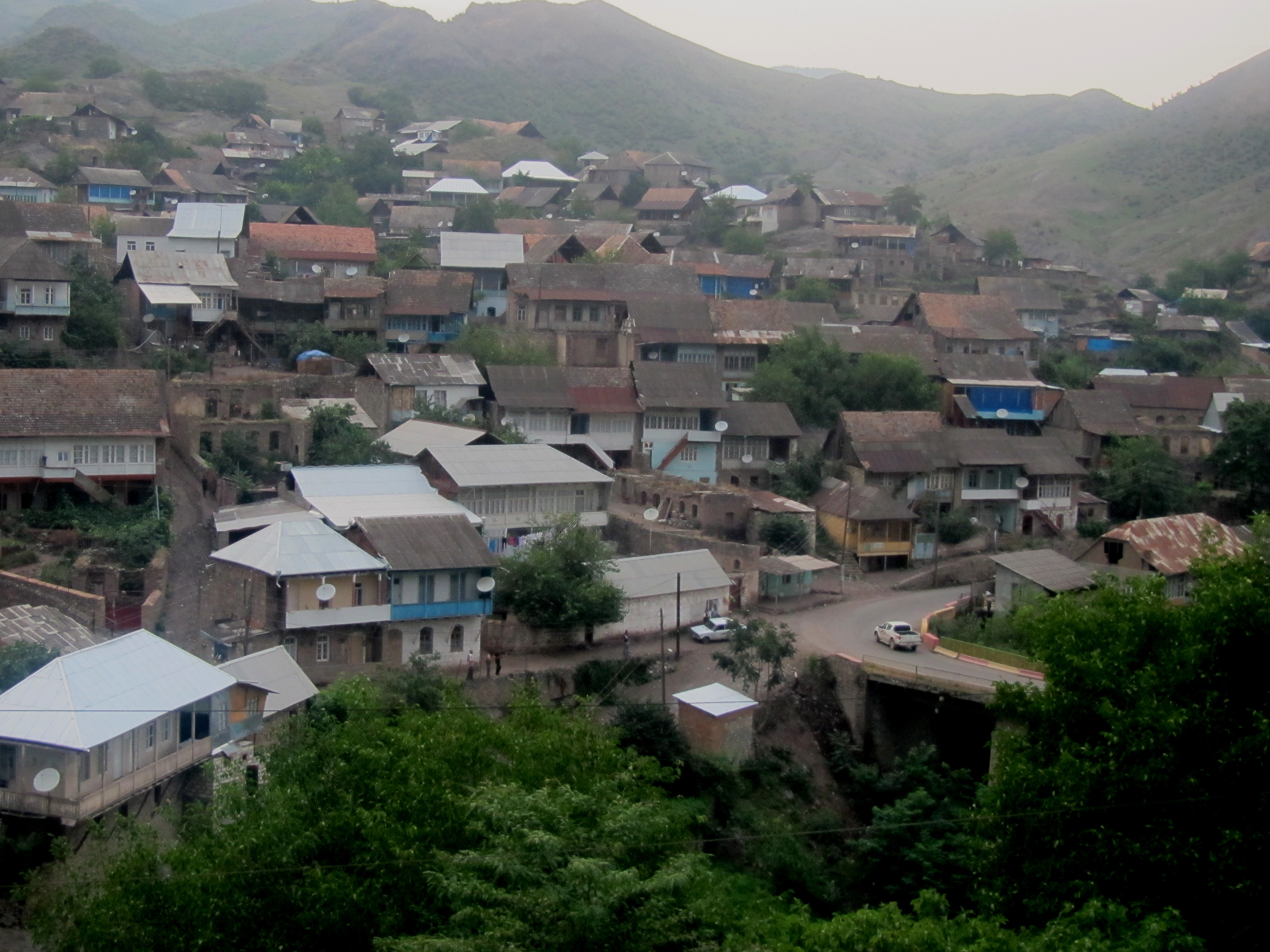

- Location within Azerbaijan
- Coordinates: 40°33′41″N 46°08′58″E
- Country: Azerbaijan
- District: Dashkasan

Population
  - Total: 2,047
- Time zone: UTC+4 (AZT)

Bayan (Azerbaijani pronunciation: [bɑjɑn]; Armenian: Բանանց, romanized: Banants Armenian pronunciation: [bɑŋɑŋt͡s]) is a village in the Dashkasan District of Azerbaijan. The village had an Armenian population before the exodus of Armenians from Azerbaijan after the outbreak of the Nagorno-Karabakh conflict.

== Demographics ==
The village currently has a population of 2,047 and is the most populous municipality in the Dashkasan District, except for the capital Daşkəsən.

== Gallery ==
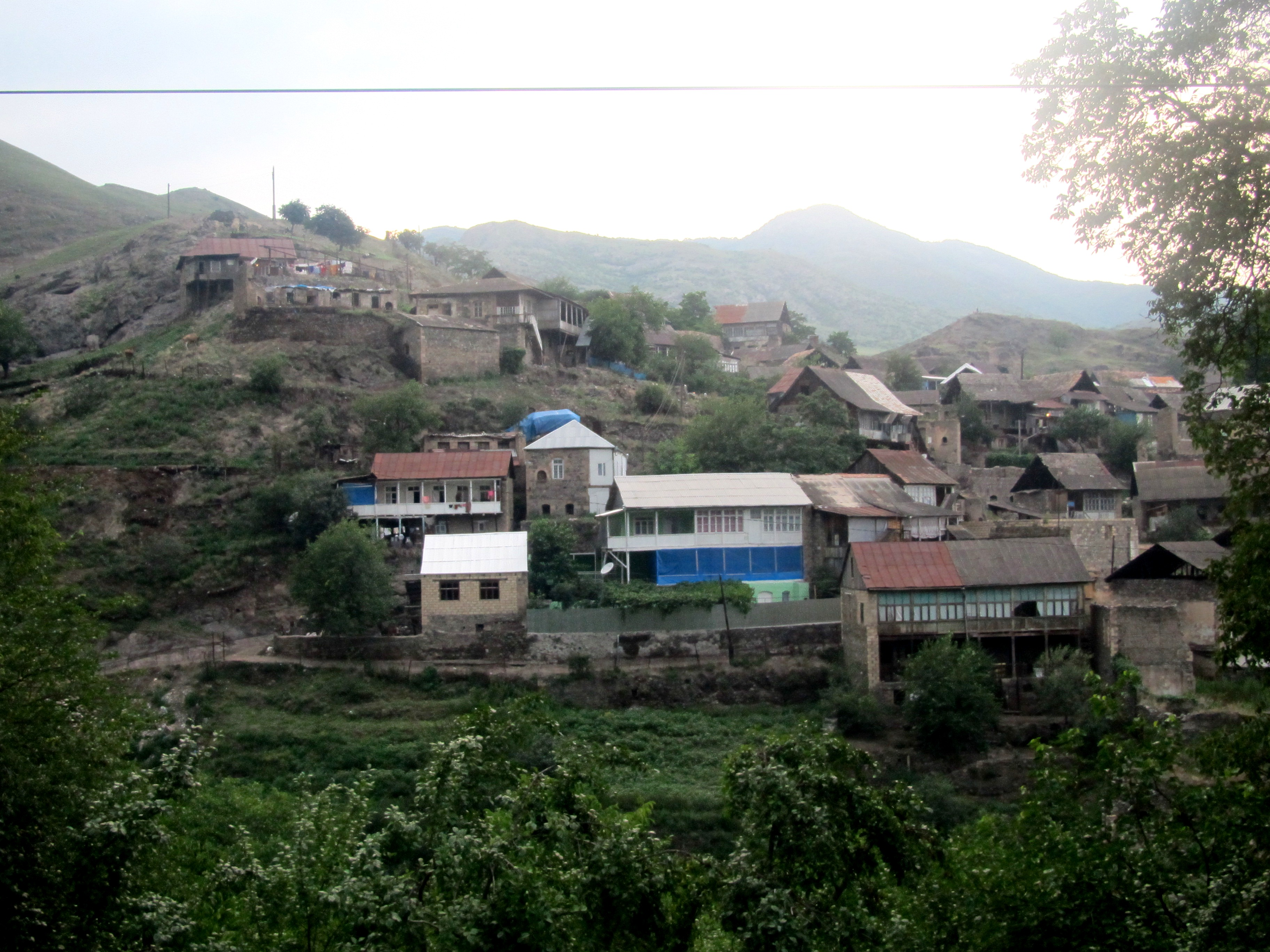

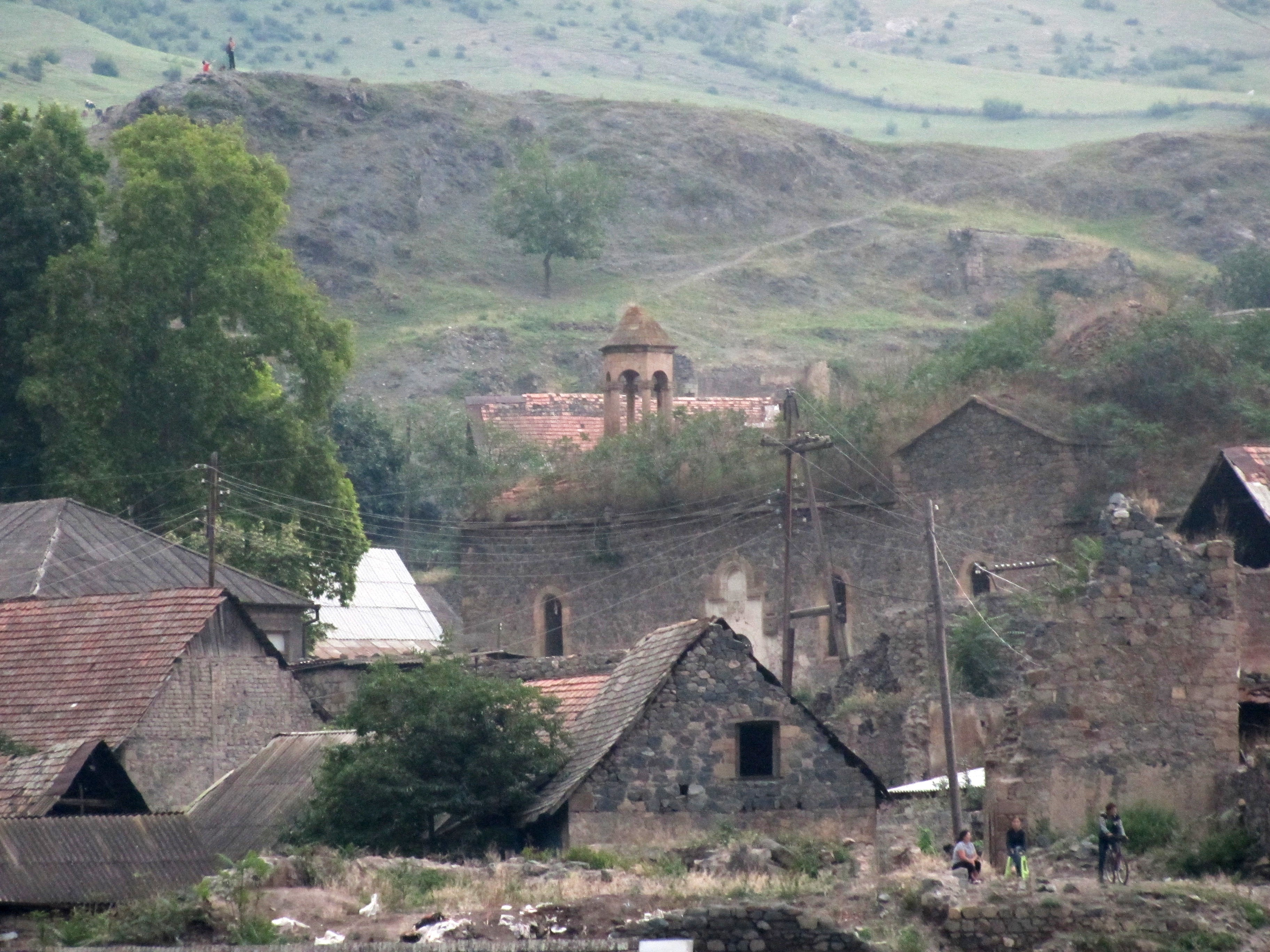
