= Suqovuşan =

Suqovuşan may refer to:

- Suqovuşan, Dashkasan, Azerbaijan
- Suqovuşan, Sabirabad, Azerbaijan
- Suqovuşan, Tartar, Azerbaijan
