= Muşavak =

- Municipality
- Location within Azerbaijan
- Coordinates: 40°26′50″N 46°07′35″E
- Country: Azerbaijan
- Rayon: Dashkasan

Population
  - Total: 362
- Time zone: UTC+4 (AZT)
  - Summer (DST): UTC+5 (AZT)

Muşavak (also, Muşavaq and Mushavak) is a village and municipality in the Dashkasan Rayon of Azerbaijan. It has a population of 362.
