= Gurbulaq =

- Municipality
- Location within Azerbaijan
- Coordinates: 40°31′47″N 45°58′33″E
- Country: Azerbaijan
- Rayon: Dashkasan

Population
  - Total: 360
- Time zone: UTC+4 (AZT)
  - Summer (DST): UTC+5 (AZT)

Gurbulaq (also, Gürbulaq) is a village and municipality in the Dashkasan Rayon of Azerbaijan. It has a population of 360.
