= Zinzahal =

- Municipality
- Location within Azerbaijan
- Coordinates: 40°24′46″N 46°09′48″E
- Country: Azerbaijan
- Rayon: Dashkasan

Population
  - Total: 805
- Time zone: UTC+4 (AZT)
  - Summer (DST): UTC+5 (AZT)

Zinzahal is a municipality in the Dashkasan Rayon of Azerbaijan, with a population of 805 spread between the villages of Zinzahal, Almalı, Kollu, Suqovuşan and Yolqullar.
