= Daşkəsən (settlement) =

Settlement in Azerbaijan

Coordinates: 40°31′28″N 46°06′25″E

Daşkəsən (Azerbaijani: Daşkəsən qəsəbə) is a settlement and municipality in the Dashkasan Rayon of Azerbaijan. It has a population of 823. The municipality consists of the settlement of Daşkəsən and the village of Aşağı Daşkəsən.
