= Aşağı Daşkəsən =

Aşağı Daşkəsən Ներքին Քարհատ • Nerkin Karhat
- Location within Azerbaijan
- Coordinates: 40°32′N 46°06′E
- Country: Azerbaijan
- District: Dashkasan
- Time zone: UTC+4 (AZT)

Aşağı Daşkəsən (Ashaghy Dashkasan, lit. 'lower Dashkasan'; Armenian: Ներքին Քարհատ, romanized: Nerkin Karhat) is a village in the municipality of Daşkəsən in the Dashkasan District of Azerbaijan. The village had an Armenian population before the exodus of Armenians from Azerbaijan after the outbreak of the Nagorno-Karabakh conflict.
