= Murovdağ =

Mountain range in the Lesser Caucasus

Murovdağ / Mrav
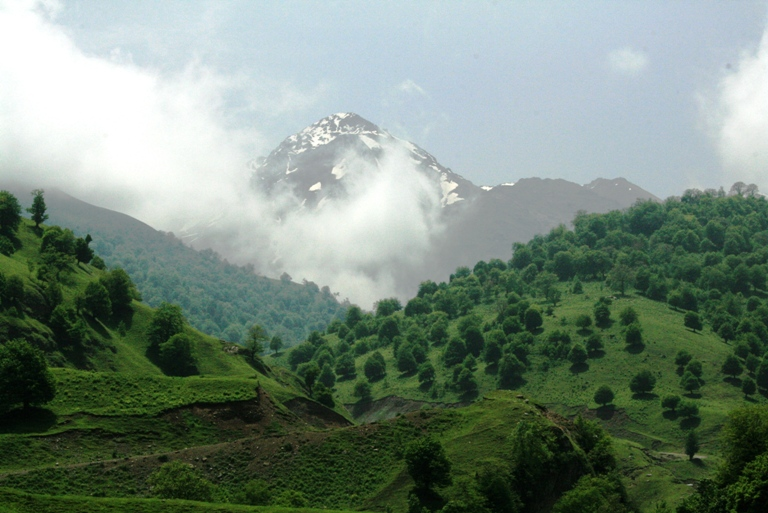

Highest point
- Peak: Gamish Mountain
- Elevation: 3,724 m (12,218 ft)

Dimensions
- Length: 70 km (43 mi)

Geography
- Location within Caucasus Mountains
- Country: Azerbaijan
- Range coordinates: 40°16′00″N 46°19′00″E
- Parent range: Armenian Highlands

The Murovdağ or Mrav (anglicized as Murovdagh,; Armenian: Մռավի լեռնաշղթա, romanized: Mr’avi Ler’nashght’a) is the highest mountain range in the Lesser Caucasus. The range is about 70 kilometres (43 mi) long, and Gamish Mountain is its highest peak at 3,724 metres (12,218 ft). It is made up mainly of Jurassic, Cretaceous and Paleogene rocks.

The Murovdağ ridge or Mrav range extends north from Hinaldag Peak through Gamish (or Gomshasar) Mountain. Geographically, it is a continuation of the Sevan mountains to the west. The northeastern slope features a group of scenic lakes, including Göygöl near the northern slope. The Karabakh Plateau extends from the south of Murovdağ/Mrav. Fir and spruce forests are spread as far southeast as the Murovdağ. The summer mountain pastures of Murovdağ/Mrav were traditionally used by Azerbaijani and Armenian shepherds.

== Name ==
According to Armenian linguist Hrachia Acharian, the name Mrav derives from the Armenian word mar’ 'darkness, fog' and means 'foggy'.

== History ==
Following the First Nagorno-Karabakh War, the mountain ridge formed the northern part of the line of contact separating the self-proclaimed Republic of Artsakh from Azerbaijan. Its southern slopes ran through the Martakert region of Nagorno-Karabakh. In late 1993–early 1994, the ridge was the scene of the bloodiest battle of the First Nagorno-Karabakh War that ended in an Armenian victory.

During the 2020 Nagorno-Karabakh war, the peak of Murovdag came under Azerbaijani control.

== Gallery ==
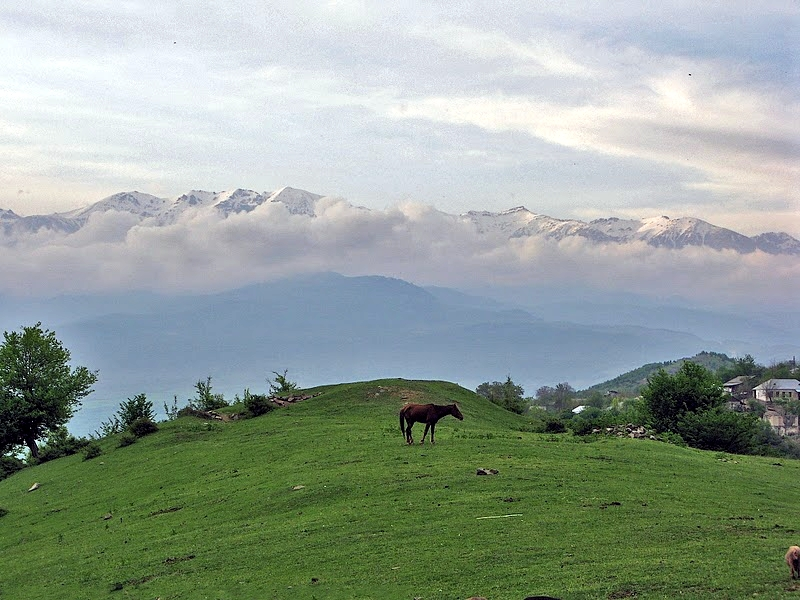
View from Nagorno-Karabakh, village of Vaghuhas

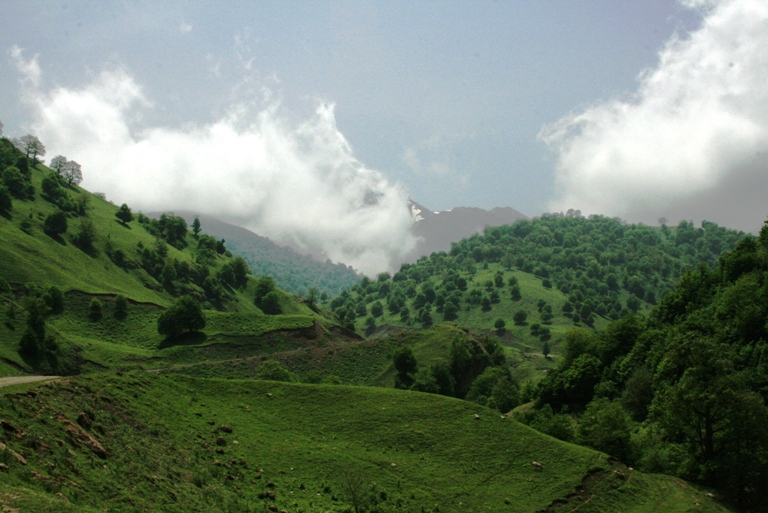

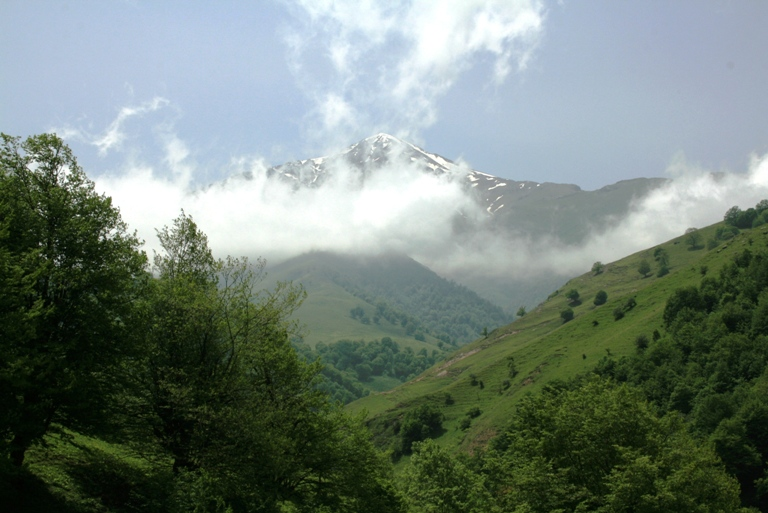

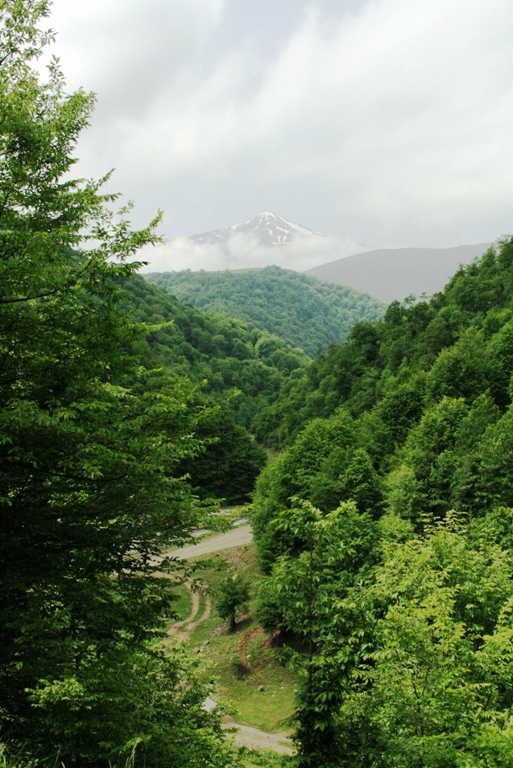
