= Alunitdağ =

- Location within Azerbaijan
- Coordinates: 40°31′18″N 46°04′50″E
- Country: Azerbaijan
- Rayon: Dashkasan
- Municipality: Daşkəsən

Population (2008)
  - Total: 726
- Time zone: UTC+4 (AZT)
  - Summer (DST): UTC+5 (AZT)

Alunitdağ (also, Aunitdagh) is a village in the Dashkasan Rayon of Azerbaijan. The village forms part of the municipality of Daşkəsən.
