= Suqovuşan, Dashkasan =

Suqovuşan
- Location within Azerbaijan
- Coordinates: 40°24′N 46°10′E
- Country: Azerbaijan
- Rayon: Dashkasan
- Time zone: UTC+4 (AZT)
  - Summer (DST): UTC+5 (AZT)

Suqovuşan (known as Gedəmiş or Gedamish until 1992) is a village in the municipality of Zinzahal in the Dashkasan Rayon of Azerbaijan.
