= Alaxançallı =

- Municipality
- Location within Azerbaijan
- Coordinates: 40°23′N 46°07′E
- Country: Azerbaijan
- Rayon: Dashkasan

Population (2009)
  - Total: 622
- Time zone: UTC+4 (AZT)
  - Summer (DST): UTC+5 (AZT)

Alaxançallı (also, Alakhanchally and Karakullar-Alakhanchally) is a village and municipality in the Dashkasan Rayon of Azerbaijan. It has a population of 586.
