= Rəsullu, Dashkasan =

Human settlement in Azerbaijan

Coordinates: 40.4747°N 45.9114°E

Rəsullu is a village in the municipality of Qabaqtəpə in the Dashkasan Rayon of Azerbaijan.
