= Zağalı =

- Municipality
- Location within Azerbaijan
- Coordinates: 40°27′26″N 46°03′32″E
- Country: Azerbaijan
- Rayon: Dashkasan

Population
  - Total: 401
- Time zone: UTC+4 (AZT)
  - Summer (DST): UTC+5 (AZT)

Zağalı (also, Zagaly) is a village and municipality in the Dashkasan Rayon of Azerbaijan. It has a population of 401.
