= Şahvələdli, Dashkasan =

Coordinates: 40.4374°N 46.2341°E

Şahvələdli is a village and municipality in the Dashkasan Rayon of Azerbaijan. It has a population of 188.
