= Almaly, Azerbaijan =

Almaly
- Location within Azerbaijan
- Coordinates: 40°24′59″N 45°52′15″E
- Country: Azerbaijan
- District: Dashkasan
- Time zone: UTC+4 (AZT)
  - Summer (DST): UTC+5 (AZT)

Almaly is a village in the Dashkasan District of Azerbaijan.
