= Mollahəsənli, Dashkasan =

Mollahəsənli
- Municipality
- Location within Azerbaijan
- Coordinates: 40°29′25″N 46°06′13″E
- Country: Azerbaijan
- Rayon: Dashkasan
- Time zone: UTC+4 (AZT)
  - Summer (DST): UTC+5 (AZT)

Mollahəsənli (also, Mollagasanli and Molla-Gasanly) is a village and municipality in the Dashkasan Rayon of Azerbaijan.
