= Xoşbulaq =

- Municipality
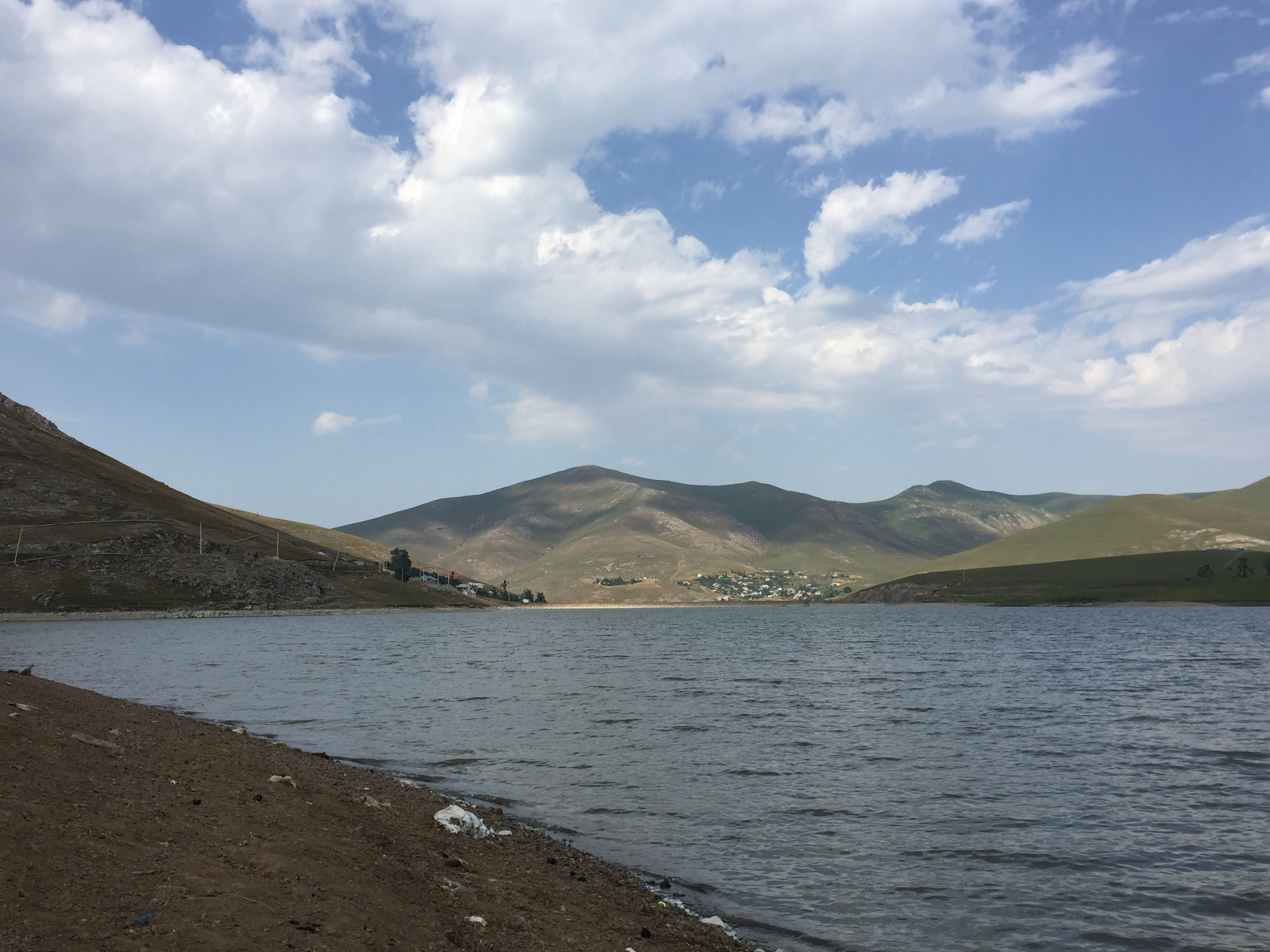

- Location within Azerbaijan
- Coordinates: 40°28′10″N 46°00′47″E
- Country: Azerbaijan
- Rayon: Dashkasan

Population
  - Total: 1,917
- Time zone: UTC+4 (AZT)
  - Summer (DST): UTC+5 (AZT)

Xoşbulaq (also, Khachbulag, Khachbulak, and Khashbulag) is a village and municipality in the Dashkasan Rayon of Azerbaijan. It has a population of 1,917.
