= Əmirvar =

Emirvar
- Municipality
- Azerbaijani: Əmirvar
- Location within Azerbaijan
- Coordinates: 40°31′08″N 45°55′41″E
- Country: Azerbaijan
- District: Dashkasan

Population
  - Total: 803
- Time zone: UTC+4 (AZT)
  - Summer (DST): UTC+5 (AZT)

Əmirvar (also, Emirvar) is a village and municipality in the Dashkasan District of Azerbaijan. It has a population of 803. The municipality consists of the villages of Emirvar and Gazakhly.
