= Qazaxlı, Dashkasan =

Gazakhly Շահումյան • Shahumyan
- Azerbaijani: Qazaxlı
- Location within Azerbaijan
- Coordinates: 40°31′N 45°56′E
- Country: Azerbaijan
- District: Dashkasan
- Municipality: Emirvar
- Time zone: UTC+4 (AZT)

Qazaxlı (also Gazakhly; Armenian: Շահումյան, romanized: Shahumyan) is a village in the Dashkasan District of Azerbaijan. The village was founded in 1922 on the site of an abandoned ancient Armenian village and had an Armenian population before the exodus of Armenians from Azerbaijan after the outbreak of the Nagorno-Karabakh conflict.

== Administration ==
The village forms part of the municipality of Emirvar.
