= Dashkasan, Varzaqan =

Dashkasan داشكسن
- Village
- Location within Iran
- Coordinates: 38°32′07″N 46°31′04″E
- Country: Iran
- Province: East Azerbaijan
- County: Varzaqan
- Bakhsh: Central
- Rural District: Sina

Population (2006)
  - Total: 155
- Time zone: UTC+3:30 (IRST)
  - Summer (DST): UTC+4:30 (IRDT)

Dashkasan (Persian: داشكسن, also Romanized as Dāshkasan and Dashkesan) is a village in Sina Rural District, in the Central District of Varzaqan County, East Azerbaijan Province, Iran. At the 2006 census, its population was 155, in 39 families.
