= Qabaqtəpə =

- Municipality
- Location within Azerbaijan
- Coordinates: 40°28′29″N 45°54′41″E
- Country: Azerbaijan
- Rayon: Dashkasan

Population
  - Total: 788
- Time zone: UTC+4 (AZT)
  - Summer (DST): UTC+5 (AZT)

Qabaqtəpə (also, Kabagtepe, Kabakhtapa, and Kabakhtepe) is a village and municipality in the Dashkasan Rayon of Azerbaijan. It has 788 people living in it. There are three villages in the municipality: Qabaqtp, Gəlinqaya, and Rəsullu.
