= Mollahəsənli, Masally =

Mollahəsənli
- Municipality
- Location within Azerbaijan
- Coordinates: 39°08′N 48°42′E
- Country: Azerbaijan
- Rayon: Masally

Population
  - Total: 776
- Time zone: UTC+4 (AZT)
  - Summer (DST): UTC+5 (AZT)

Mollahəsənli (also, Mollagasanli and Molla-Gasanly) is a village and municipality in the Masally Rayon of Azerbaijan. It has a population of 776.
