= Molla Həsənli, Jabrayil =

Molla Həsənli
- Location within Azerbaijan
- Coordinates: 39°24′48″N 46°53′22″E
- Country: Azerbaijan
- District: Jabrayil
- Time zone: UTC+4 (AZT)
  - Summer (DST): UTC+5 (AZT)

Molla Həsənli (Molla Hasanli) is a village in the Jabrayil District of Azerbaijan.
