= Almalı, Dashkasan =

Almaly
- Azerbaijani: Almalı
- Location within Azerbaijan
- Coordinates: 40°25′06″N 46°11′20″E
- Country: Azerbaijan
- District: Dashkasan
- Municipality: Zinzahal
- Time zone: UTC+4 (AZT)
  - Summer (DST): UTC+5 (AZT)

Almalı (also, Almaly) is a village in the Dashkasan District of Azerbaijan. The village forms part of the municipality of Zinzahal.
