= Dashkasan (city) =

Dashkasan Daşkəsən
- City & Municipality
- Location within Azerbaijan
- Coordinates: 40°29′41″N 46°04′38″E
- Country: Azerbaijan
- District: Dashkasan
- Founded: 1948
- Elevation: 1,630 m (5,350 ft)

Population (2010)
  - Total: 11,262
- Time zone: UTC+4 (AZT)
- Area code: +994 216

Dashkasan (Azerbaijani: Daşkəsən), or Karhat (Armenian: Քարհատ) is a city, municipality and the capital of the Dashkasan District of Azerbaijan. It has a population of 10,801. The municipality consists of the city of Dashkasan and the village of Alunitdağ.

== Etymology ==
The Azerbaijani name of the settlement is Dashkasan, which translated from Azerbaijani means "cutting stone" (Daş - stone, kesan - cut, cut).

The Armenian name of the settlement is Karhat and it is composed of the word ‘kar,’ (Armenian for ‘stone,’) and the root ‘hat’ of the verb ‘hatel,’ i.e. (Armenian for ‘to quarry.’).

In the northeast and south of the city are the former Armenian villages of Upper Karhat and Lower Karhat, whose Azerbaijani names are Yuxarı Daşkasan and Aşağı Daşkasan.

== History ==
Daskasan received the status of a city օn March 16, 1948․

The mountains of Dashkasan were used as pastures for a long time. Khoshbulag was inhabited by the primitive people in the Stone Age whose main engagement was hunting. In the 3rd century B.C. people engaged in animal breeding rose to Khoshbulag pastures. The tradition is followed up today. Dashkasan summer pastures are 2000 m high from sea level. Different animal-breeding tribes settled here and built Cyclops-like small towers to protect themselves from attacks. Since that period Dashkasan turned to the place of settlement.

Tumuli type burying monuments found in the archaeological digs carried out in 1959–1960 in the places of ancient settlement in Dashkasan show that people used this area as summer pastures and there was only one way to those pastures in summer- north-east, the valley of the river Kur.

The Middle Ages in Dashkasan are characterized with the development of cultural work.

After World War II Dashkasan was turned to an industrial town due to mining of iron ore deposits. It began to form on the basis of a temporary settlement of builders and a small mining settlement that arose during the period of preparation for the development of the richest iron ore deposits of industrial importance. In 1948 it received city status.

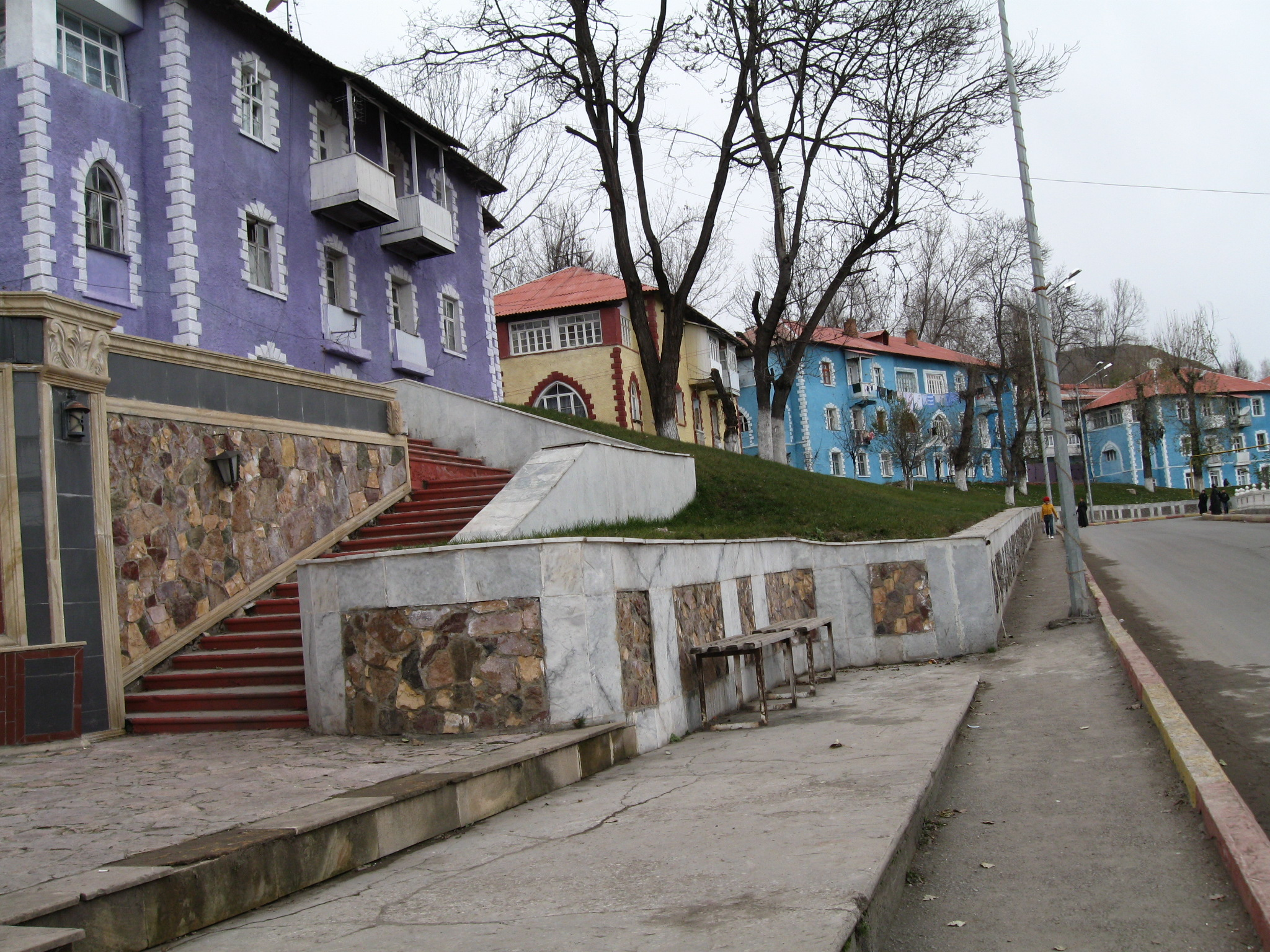
Examples of the German-built apartment buildings in Dashkasan.

The region Dashkasan is very rich in natural resources. In the period of the Soviet Union the so-called strategic products of the region, i.e., ironstone, aluminum, cobalt, marble and others were actively exploited.

Many of the buildings in present-day Dashkasan were constructed by German POWs during the aftermath of World War II. Workers that died during the city's construction are buried in a German cemetery alongside the road between Dashkasan and Gəncə.

In the northeast and south of the city are the former Armenian villages of Upper Karhat and Lower Karhat, whose Azerbaijani names are Yuxarı Daşkasan and Aşağı Daşkasan.

=== Economy ===
The name of Karhat indicates what the local business was: it is composed of the word ‘kar,’ (Armenian for ‘stone,’) and the root ‘hat’ of the verb ‘hatel,’ i.e. (Armenian for ‘to quarry.’)

The locals used to extract iron ore and obtain iron, but when iron imported from Russia proved far cheaper, they gave it up.

By the second half of the 19th century, the number of the Karhat Armenians engaged in husbandry was reduced because of the appropriation of most of the village lands by the Siemens German Company.

Between 1894 and 1895, some of the local Armenians founded another village in the area of the upper course of the river Artinajur, 4 kilometres south-west of their previous place of living. It was called Verin (i.e. ‘Upper’) Karhat while the old village which was later renamed Nerkin (i.e. ‘Lower’) Karhat.

=== Education ===
In 1905, when the Tsarist Government had granted permission to Armenian educational institutions to resume their activity, the Armenians of Karhat convened a meeting on September 27 of the same year and decided to found a one-year school. Gandzak inhabitant Mrs. Yeghisabet N. Hambardzumian Malkhassiants sponsored the construction of that school in memory of her late husband Stepanos Malkhassiants.

St. Stepanossian Unisex School opened in 1908. That year, the school had 54 pupils. In 1909, the school had a single teacher and 70 schoolchildren, including 4 girls. In 1911, the school had 82 pupils of which 6 were girls and 2 teachers. In 1913, the school closed since it had no teachers. Upper Karhat school opened 1908 as a co-ed institution and had 70 students, 4 of which were girls.

In the 1911-1912 school year, the school operated with a three-year course, had 3 classes, 26 male students, 3 female students, and 2 teachers (Aram Papyants, Ishkhan Hayryants).

=== Culture ===
According to some manuscripts, Karhat had two churches: St. Hakob church, mentioned in 1656, and Sourb Astvatsatsin church (demolished in 1927), mentioned in 1656 and 1659. A great number of documents dating from before 1878 (1849, 1852, 1861, 1872, 1878) attest that the village had a church with a wooden roof called St. Stepanos. From 1882 (1882, 1885), the same sanctuary is known as a stone monument dedicated to the Holy Virgin.

In the centre of the village, there are inscribed cross-stones dating from the 9th to 11th centuries.

A khachkar called Gyozal Kar (i.e. Beautiful Stone) was located where the village started. Later the inhabitants of Karhat moved that valuable cross-stone to the centre of the village, where it stood until the deportation of Armenians in 1989.

Hardly a kilometre south of the village, there is a small medieval building towering at the top of a rock, the fort of Ghala. It has a semi-circular tower in the north-west.

The church of Verin Karhat was built on the eastern edge of the village at the left mouth of Artinajr river. The building of the chւռցհ was consecrated with the name of Holy Translator. In 1914, the spiritual authorities satisfied the request of the village residents to repair the roof of the church. The church was destroyed in the 1920s.

=== Lower Karhat ===
The village is situated on the southeast-facing slope of a gorge lying on the left bank of the river Artinajur, a kilometre east of the district centre, at an altitude of 1,280 to 1,380 metres above sea level. It retains some burial mounds dating back to the period between the Bronze and Iron Ages, as attested by the results of excavations conducted there.

The monuments of material culture preserved in its territory prove that it has existed since at least the Middle Ages, although the earliest sources mentioning it date from the 17th century, when it became a scriptorium. There are 6 manuscripts that have reached us or are known. According to a record from 1691, a certain Hakob was Head of Karhat village.

=== Upper Karhat ===
It is located on the left-hand side of the Artinajur river, at an altitude of 1480-1640m above sea level.

There are khachkars found in the village of Upper Karhat, dating back to the 10-11th centuries. The village got its name "Upper Karhat" in 1895 when the Armenian of Lower Karhat moved there.

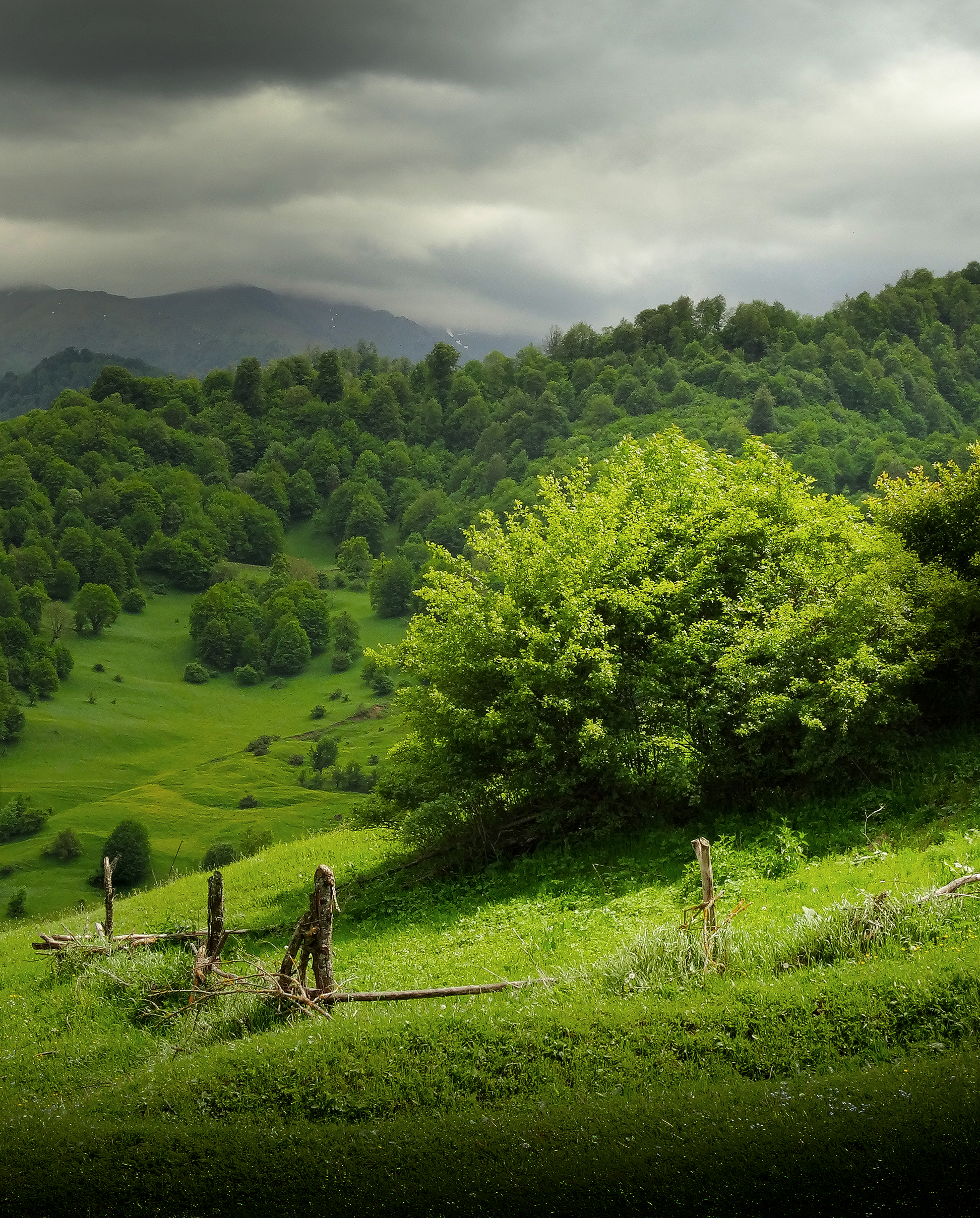
Nature of Dashkesen

==== Population ====
year	houses	males	females	total
1839	12	63	60	123
1845		99	114	213
1847		91	80	171
1849		91	95	186
1852		96	92	188
1861	18			
1866	40	190	145	335
1871	47			
1872		434	221	655
1873				
1874				
1875				
1876				
1877		413	211	624
1878		420	213	633
1881		432	223	655
1882		443	225	668
1883		459	244	703
1885	55	402	354	756
1886	80	435	365	796
1887		447	353	800
1888		448	354	802
1889		463	366	829
1890	100	479	378	857
1891		486	393	879
1892		491	398	889
1893		488	416	904
1894		494	420	914

== See also ==
- Ganja
- Sumgait
- Nakhchivan
