= Line of Contact (Nagorno-Karabakh) =

Line separating Armenian and Azerbaijani forces in the Nagorno-Karabakh conflict

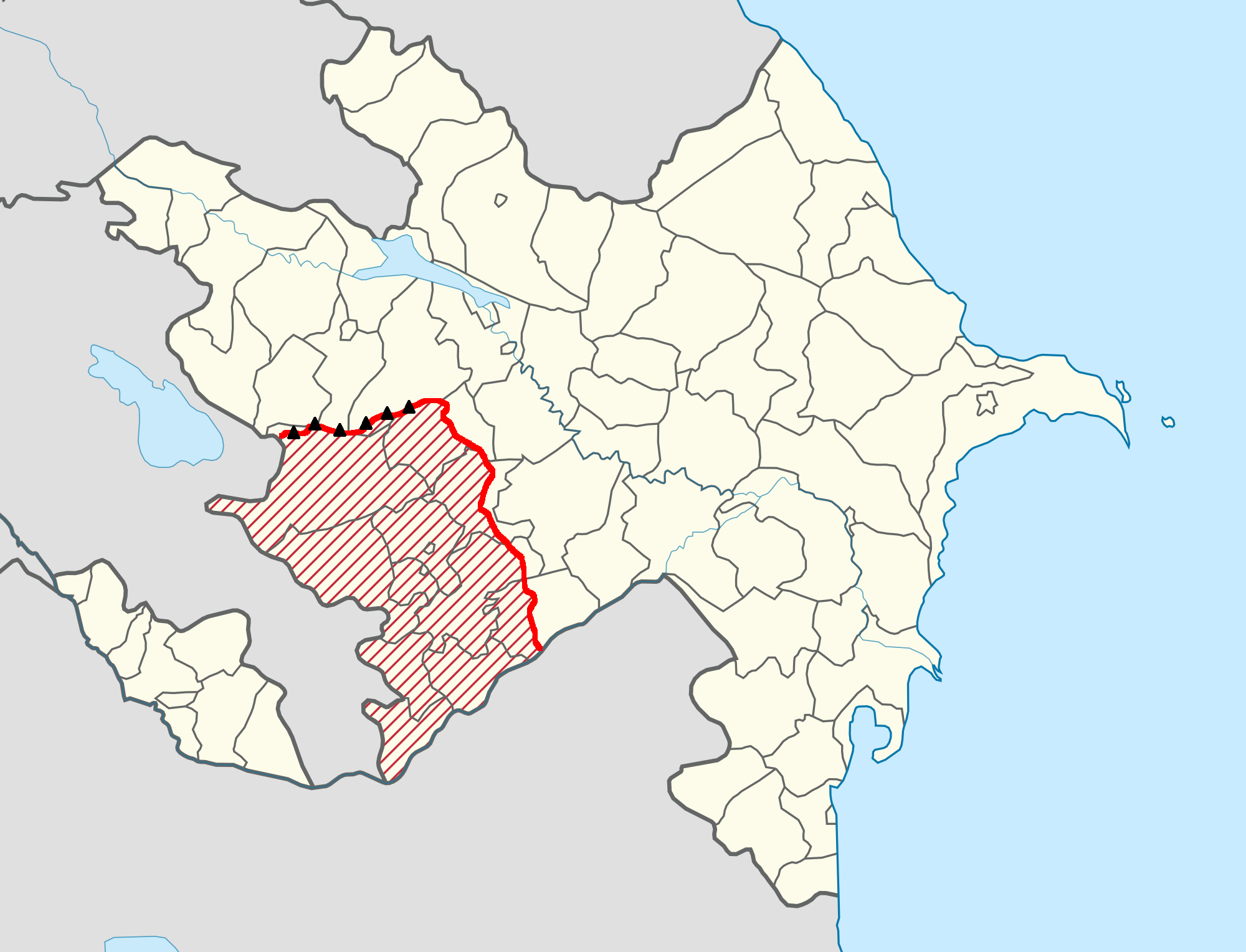
The Nagorno-Karabakh line of contact (1994–2020) in red, with the largely unguarded Murovdag (Mrav) mountain range in the north.

The Line of Contact (Armenian: շփման գիծ, shp’man gits, Azerbaijani: təmas xətti) was the front line which separated Armenian forces (the Nagorno-Karabakh Defense Army and the Armenian Armed Forces) and the Azerbaijan Armed Forces from the end of the First Nagorno-Karabakh War in 1994 until the 2020 Nagorno-Karabakh ceasefire agreement.

It was formed in the aftermath of the May 1994 ceasefire that ended the First Nagorno-Karabakh War (1988–94). During its existence, the mountain range of Murovdag (Mrav) was the northern part of the line of contact and essentially served as a natural border between the two forces. The length of the line of contact was between 180 kilometres (110 mi) and 200 kilometres (120 mi) until 2020.

For the first time since the 1994 ceasefire, the front line slightly shifted during the 2016 Nagorno-Karabakh conflict, when Azerbaijan recaptured some hectares of territory. The Line of Contact effectively dissolved during the Second Nagorno-Karabakh War, after Azerbaijan made significant military gains against the internationally unrecognised Republic of Artsakh including capturing parts of the original Nagorno-Karabakh Autonomous Oblast. Armenian forces later withdrew from almost the entirety of Karabkh territories that it remained in control of as part of the 2020 ceasefire agreement, officially ending the existence of the Line of Contact. A new line of contact then existed between the remaining Artsakhi zone in the former Autonomous Oblast controlled by Russian Armed Forces peacekeepers and the recaptured Azerbaijani territories until 2024, when the Republic of Artsakh was dissolved following an Azerbaijani offensive in September 2023 and a ceasefire agreement.

== Terminology ==
The term "Line of Contact" was widely used in official documents and statements, including by the OSCE Minsk Group.

Some Armenian analysts, including Ara Papian encouraged the Armenian side to avoid the term "line of contact", instead calling it a "state border" between Artsakh and Azerbaijan. Independent journalist and author Tatul Hakobyan writes of it as a state border of Azerbaijan and Artsakh and notes that it is called the "line of contact" in international lexicon.

In Azerbaijan, the "line of contact" is often referred to as the "line of occupation".

== Description ==
The line of contact was, immediately after the ceasefire, a "relatively quiet zone with barbed wire and lightly armed soldiers sitting in trenches", according to Thomas de Waal. There was also a relatively large no-man's land after the ceasefire which was several kilometers wide in some places. It was reduced to a few hundred meters in most areas of the line of contact due to Azerbaijani redeployments into the former neutral zone. In 2016, there were around 20,000 men on each side of the heavily militarized line of contact. Since the ceasefire the line of contact had become a heavily militarized, fortified and mined no-man's-land and a buffer zone of trenches. According to de Waal, it is the "most militarised zone in the wider Europe," and one of the three most militarized zones in the world (along with Kashmir and Korea). The trenches along the line of contact were extensively compared to those of World War I.

The line of contact was regularly monitored by a group of six OSCE observers, headed by Andrzej Kasprzyk of Poland. There were exchanges of fire virtually on a daily basis. There had been significant violations of the ceasefire on various occasions, usually characterized by low-intensity fighting. Significant fighting occurred in April 2016, when for the first time since the ceasefire the line of contact was shifted, though not significantly. According to Laurence Broers of Chatham House, "Although slivers of territory changed hands for the first time since 1994, little of strategic significance appears to have altered on the ground." The 2016 clashes also marked the first time since the 1994 ceasefire that heavy artillery was used, while the Second Nagorno-Karabakh War saw use of heavy artillery, armoured warfare, and drone warfare. On October 9, 2020, when President of Azerbaijan Ilham Aliyev addressed the nation, he stated, "There is no status quo. There is no line of contact. We smashed it."

== Impact ==
According to Kolosov and Zotova (2020), "the deployment of military units along the separation line, the special regime of the border zone on both sides, constant skirmishes, and the destruction during the war and immediately after it of a number of cities and other settlements turned the border territories into an economic desert."

According to the International Crisis Group, all of 150,000 Karabakh Armenians are "within reach of Azerbaijani missiles and artillery shells", while around twice the number of Azerbaijanis (300,000) "live in the 15km-wide zone along the Azerbaijani side of the line of contact."

=== Travel advisory ===
- United States: "Casualties continue to occur in the Nagorno-Karabakh conflict. Intermittent gunfire and occasional use of artillery systems, including land mines and mortars, result in deaths and injuries each year. Avoid roads near the ‘line of contact’ and roads near the international border between Armenia and Azerbaijan." - 7 August 2020
- United Kingdom: "The dispute over Nagorno-Karabakh remains unresolved. Consular support is not available in the Nagorno-Karabakh region. Although a ceasefire has been in place since May 1994, the borders between Armenia and Azerbaijan and Azerbaijani territory occupied by Armenian forces are closed. There are no peacekeeping forces separating the sides. There are regular exchanges of sniper fire and some skirmishes. The border areas between Armenia and Azerbaijan also contain mines and unexploded ordnance. Any foreigners venturing within 5km of these borders are liable to be stopped by the police or the military." - 6 April 2020
- Australia: "Regular armed clashes occur in the buffer zone between the closed Armenia-Azerbaijan border and the ceasefire line. Conflict also occurs in the disputed enclave of Nagorno-Karabakh and its surrounding military zone. All these areas have unmarked landmines. If, despite our advice, you travel to these areas, get professional security advice." - 8 June 2020

== See also ==
- Armenia–Azerbaijan border
- Armenian-occupied territories surrounding Nagorno-Karabakh
