= Charektar =

Village in Azerbaijan

Charektar Չարեքտար Çərəkdar
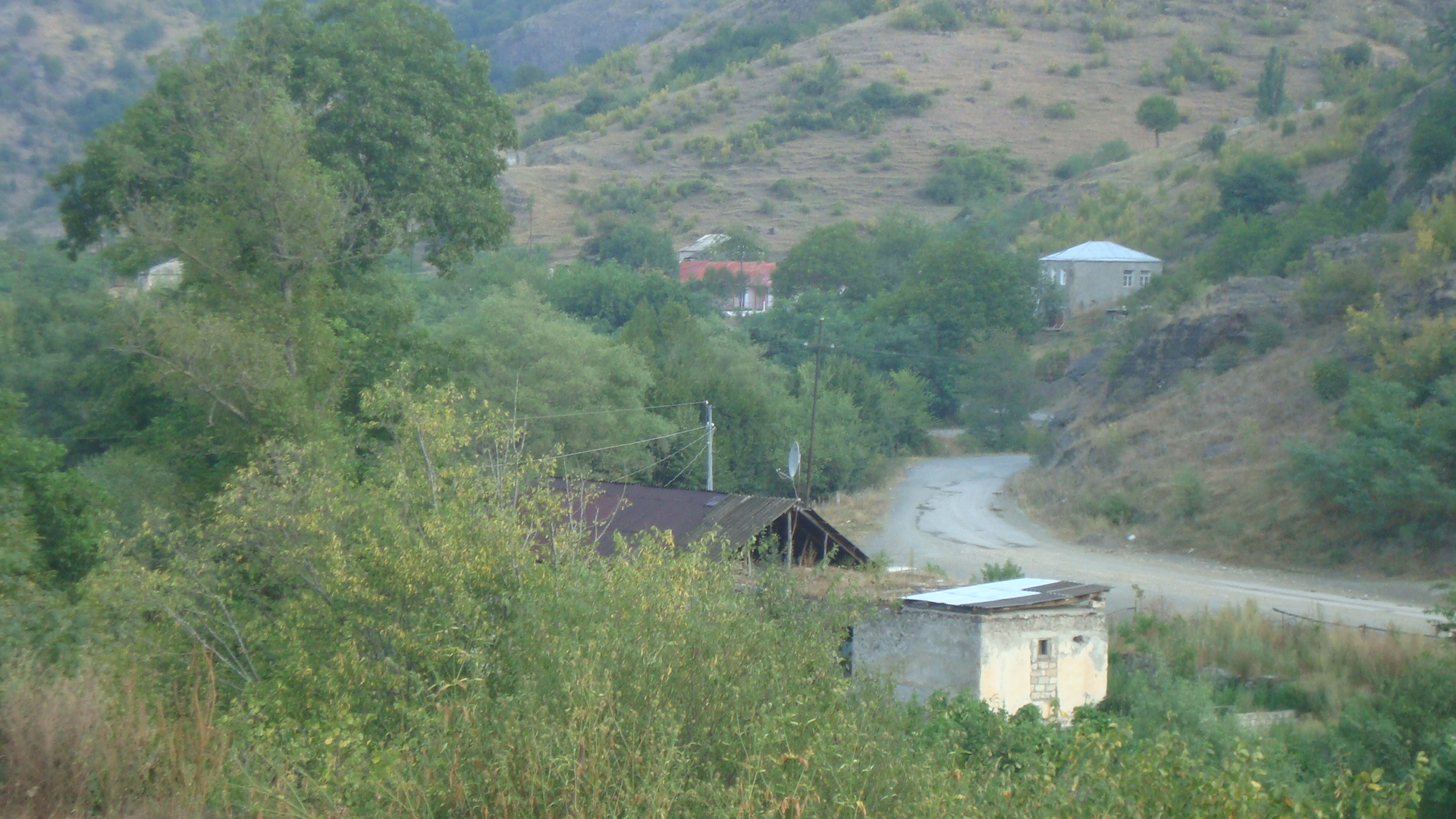

- Location within Azerbaijan Location within East Zangezur Economic Region
- Coordinates: 40°08′44″N 46°20′40″E
- Country: Azerbaijan
  - District: Aghdara

Population (2015)
  - Total: 262
- Time zone: UTC+4 (AZT)

Charektar (Armenian: Չարեքտար; Azerbaijani: Çərəkdar) is a village in the Aghdara District of Azerbaijan, in the region of Nagorno-Karabakh. The village had an Azerbaijani-majority population prior to their exodus during the First Nagorno-Karabakh War. Before 2023, it was controlled by the breakaway Republic of Artsakh as part of its claimed Shahumyan Province.

== Etymology ==
The name Charektar is of Persian origin.

== History ==
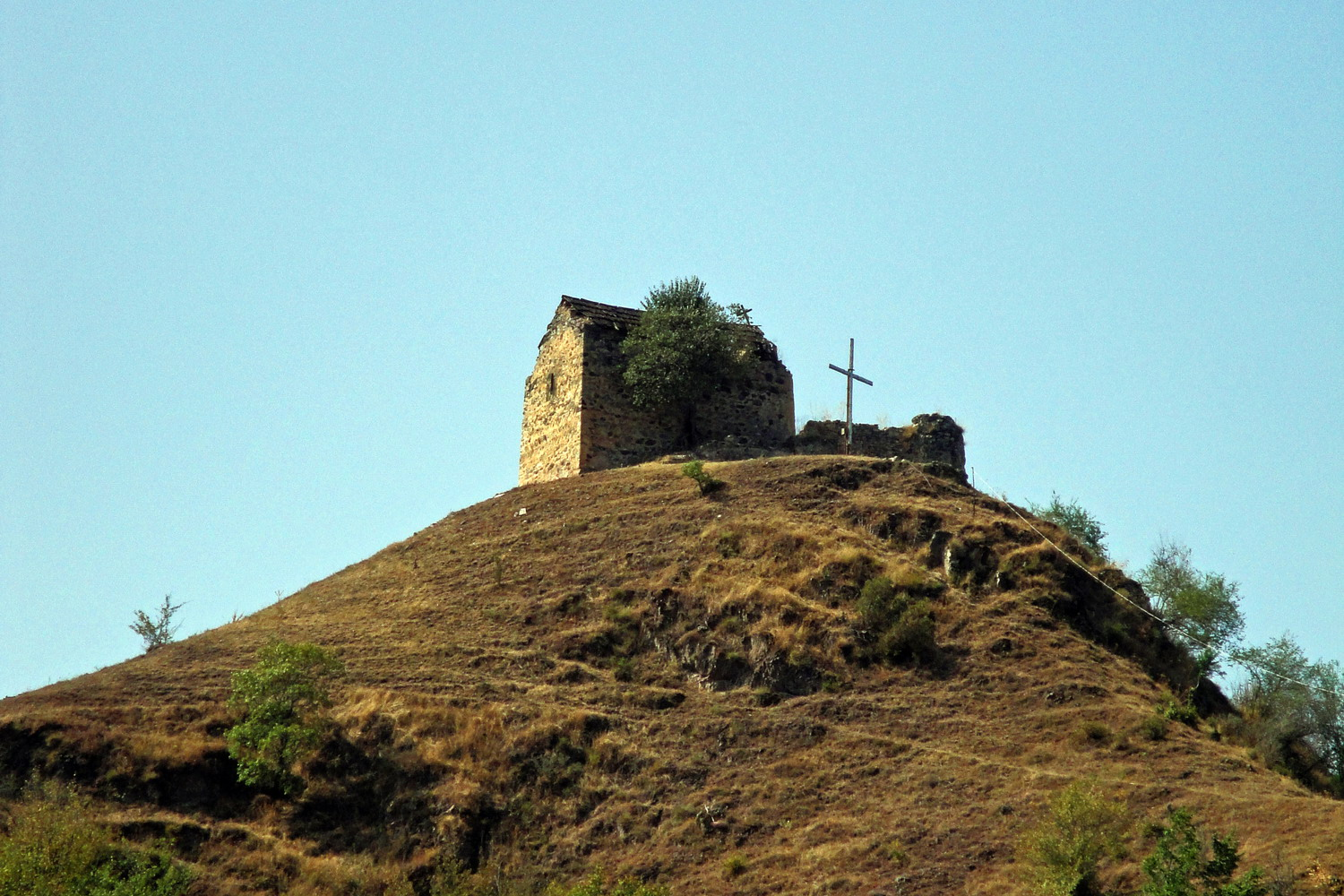
The 12th/13th-century Charektar Monastery (Mesropavank)

During the Soviet period, the village was a part of the Mardakert District of the Nagorno-Karabakh Autonomous Oblast, and was incorporated into the Shahumyan Province of the Republic of Artsakh after the First Nagorno-Karabakh War.

== Historical heritage sites ==
Historical heritage sites in and around the village include the 12th/13th-century Charektar Monastery and a 12th/13th-century khachkar.

== Economy and culture ==
The population is mainly engaged in agriculture and animal husbandry. As of 2015, the village has a municipal building, a secondary school, and a medical centre.

== Demographics ==
In 1912, the village had 199 inhabitants, mostly Caucasian Tatars (Azerbaijanis). In 1993 the village had 202 Azerbaijani inhabitants. The inhabitants of the village fled during the First Nagorno-Karabakh War and Charektar was subsequently settled by Armenians.

The village had an Armenian-majority population of 159 inhabitants in 2005, and 262 inhabitants in 2015.

== Gallery ==
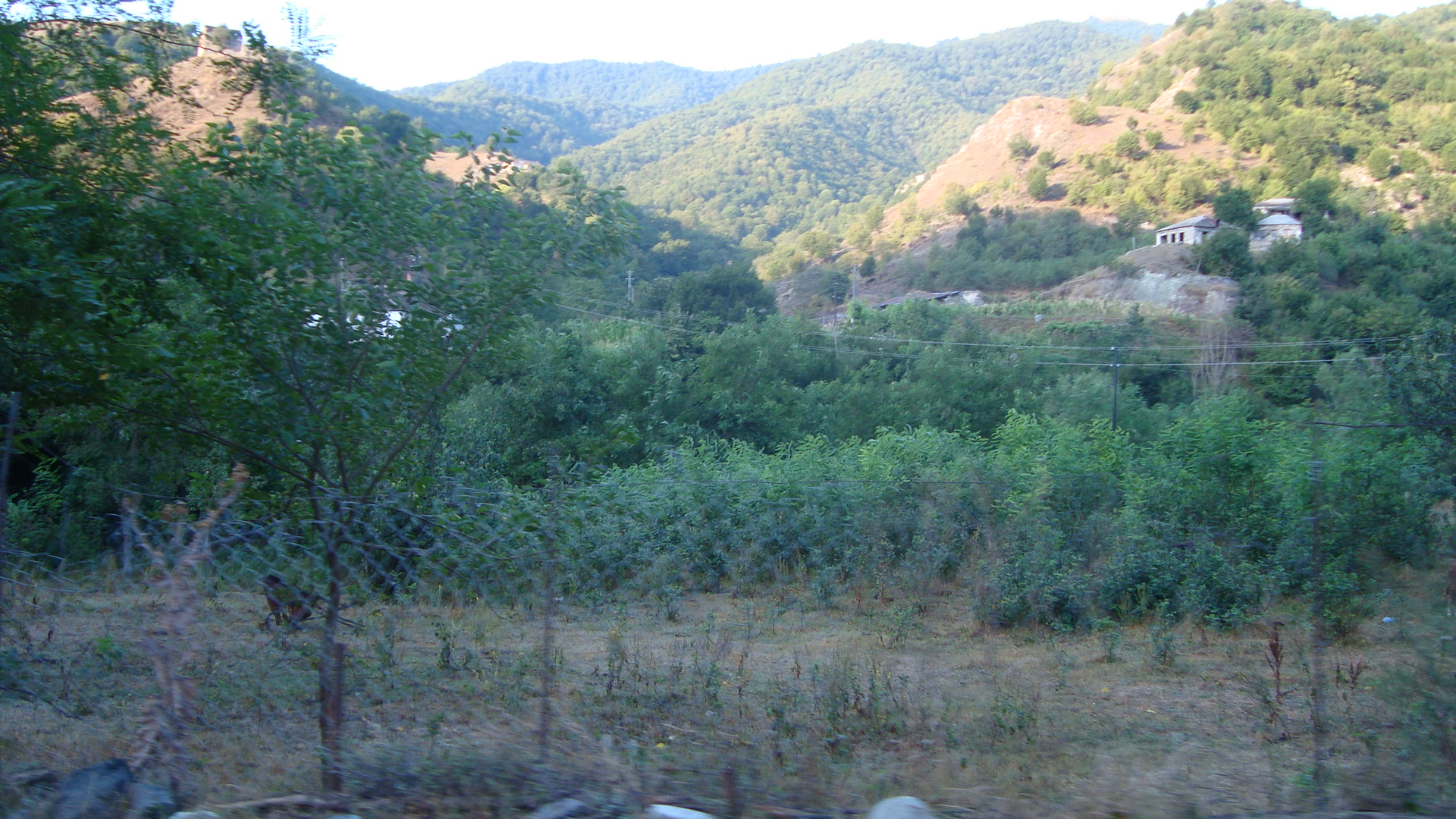

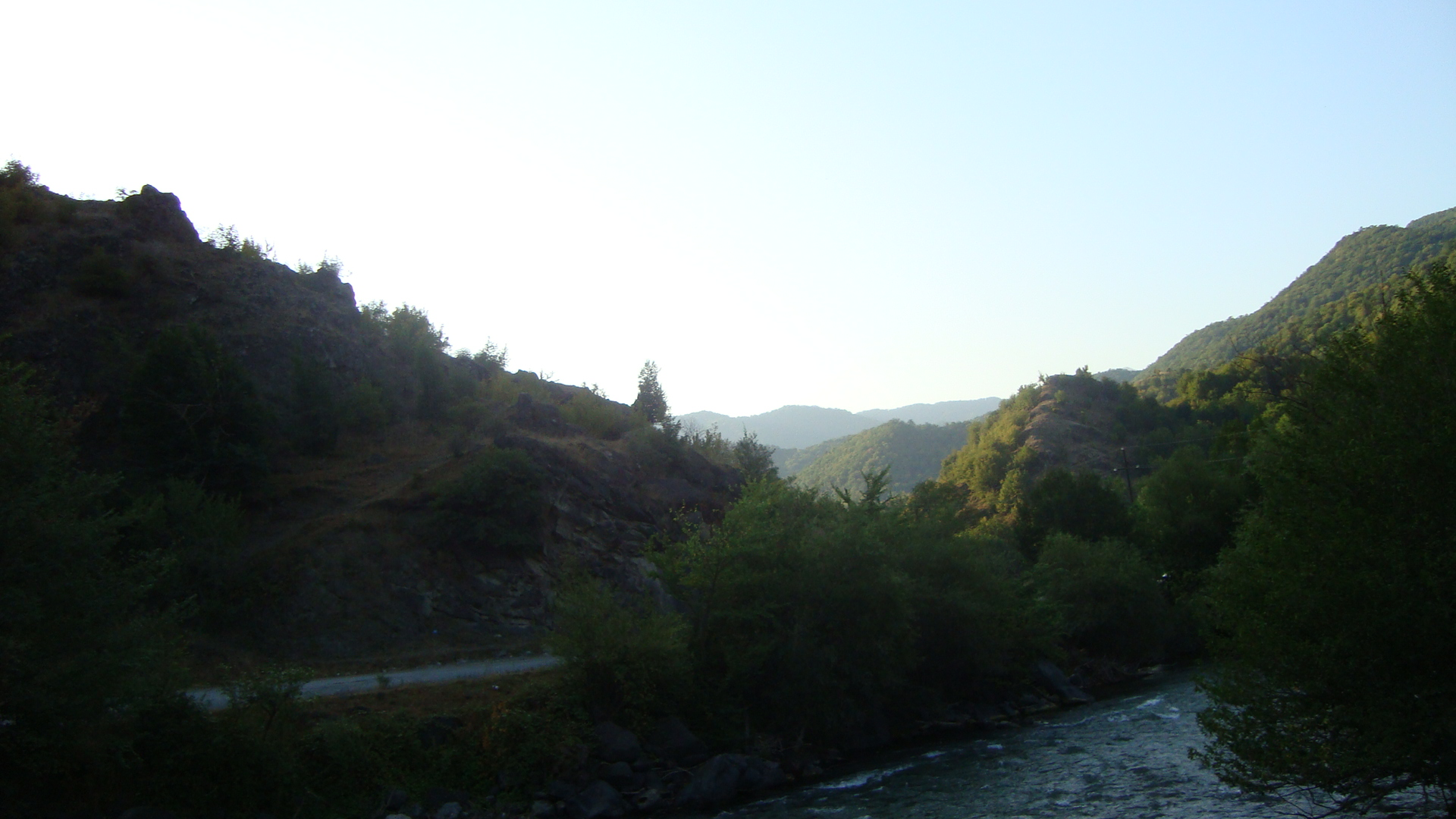

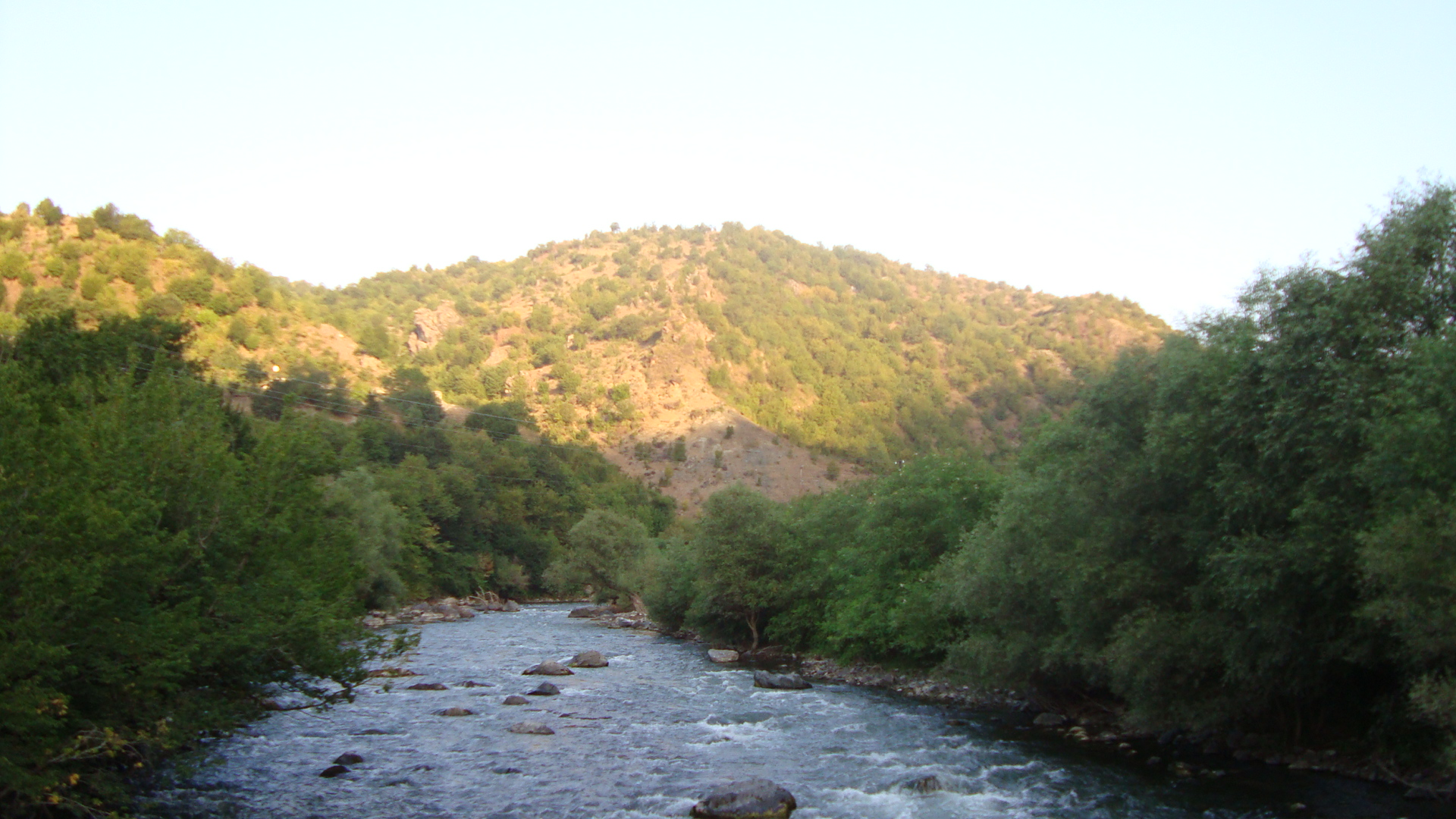

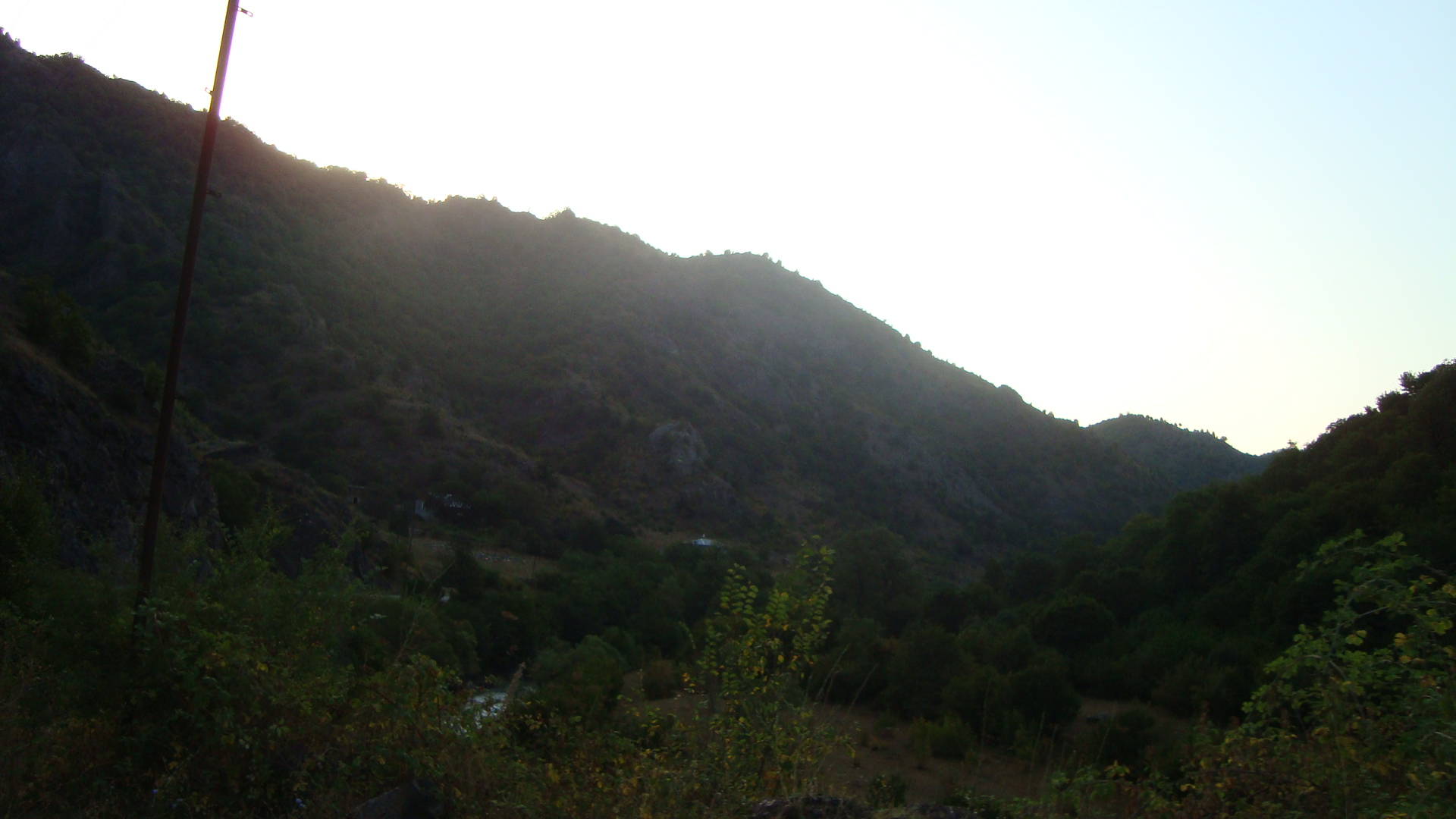
