= Qazaxlı, Samukh =

Gazakhly
- Azerbaijani: Qazaxlı
- Location within Azerbaijan
- Coordinates: 41°08′05″N 46°18′30″E
- Country: Azerbaijan
- District: Samukh
- Time zone: UTC+4 (AZT)
  - Summer (DST): UTC+5 (AZT)

Qazaxlı (also, Gazakhly) is a village in the Samukh District of Azerbaijan.
