= Tatevik Hayrapetyan =

Armenian politician (born 1989)

Member of the National Assembly of Armenia
- Incumbent
- Assumed office 2018

Personal details
- Born: Tatevik Hayrapetyan; 30 September 1989 (age 37) Yerevan, Armenia
- Education: Yerevan State University

Tatevik Hayrapetyan (born 30 September 1989) is an Armenian historian and politician of the Civil Contract. She is a member of the National Assembly of Armenia since 2018.

== Education ==
She studied history at the Yerevan State University from which she graduated with a BSc in 2010. In 2012 she obtained a MSc in History at the same university. In 2016 she obtained a Ph.D from the Institute of Eastern Studies of the Armenian National Academy of Sciences.

== Professional career ==
From 2011 and 2012, she was employed as a translator from Azerbaijani language by the Armenian news agency News.am. Between 2012 and 2016 she was an analyst on Azerbaijan related issues at the Armenian Public Relations and Information Center. By 2017, she became a lecturer on history at the Yerevan State University.

== Political career ==
In the Armenian parliamentary elections of December 2018, she was elected as a member of parliament for the My Step Alliance. Besides she serves as a substitute at the Parliamentary Assembly of the Council of Europe since January 2019.

=== Political positions ===
She is known for her concern on the Armenian Prisoners of War of the Nagorno Karabakh conflict and raised the subject also in the PACE.
