= Şahvələdli, Jabrayil =

Şahvələdli
- Location within Azerbaijan
- Coordinates: 39°25′06.3″N 47°01′16.6″E
- Country: Azerbaijan
- District: Zangilan
- Time zone: UTC+4 (AZT)
  - Summer (DST): UTC+5 (AZT)

Şahvələdli is a village in the Jabrayil District of Azerbaijan.
