= Yuxarı Daşkəsən =

Yuxarı Daşkəsən Վերին Քարհատ • Verin Karhat
- Municipality
- Location within Azerbaijan
- Coordinates: 40°28′42″N 46°03′56″E
- Country: Azerbaijan
- District: Dashkasan

Population
  - Total: 1,748
- Time zone: UTC+4 (AZT)

Yuxarı Daşkəsən (Yukhary Dashkasan, lit. 'upper Dashkasan'; Armenian: Վերին Քարհատ, romanized: Verin Karhat) is a village and municipality in the Dashkasan District of Azerbaijan. The village had an Armenian population before the exodus of Armenians from Azerbaijan after the outbreak of the Nagorno-Karabakh conflict.

== Toponymy ==
The village is also known as Verin Karagat and Verkhniy Dashkesan.

== Demographics ==
The village has a population of 1,748.
