= Dashkasan District =

District in western Azerbaijan

Coordinates: 40°31′05″N 46°04′58″E

- District
- Map of Azerbaijan showing Dashkasan District
- Country: Azerbaijan
- Region: Ganja-Dashkasan
- Established: 8 August 1930
- Capital: Dashkasan
- Settlements: 49

Government
  - Governor: Ahad Abiyev

Area
  - Total: 1,050 km^{2} (410 sq mi)

Population (2020)
  - Total: 35,400
  - Density: 33.7/km^{2} (87.3/sq mi)
- Time zone: UTC+4 (AZT)
- Postal code: 1600
- Website: dashkesen-ih.gov.az

Dashkasan District (Azerbaijani: Daşkəsən rayonu) is one of the 66 districts of Azerbaijan. It is located in the west of the country and belongs to the Ganja-Dashkasan Economic Region. The district borders the districts of Goygol, Kalbajar, Gadabay, Shamkir, and the Gegharkunik Province of Armenia. Its capital and largest city is Dashkasan. As of 2020, the district had a population of 35,400.

== History ==
The district was established on 8 August 1930 and was known as Dastafur (Azerbaijani: Dəstəfur) until 1956, when it was changed to Dashkasan. The capital was established as an urban facility on March 16, 1948, after the end of World War II, mainly to explore and mine iron ore and other natural resources.

== Administrative divisions ==
The rayon itself was founded as an administrative center in 1930 and was named Dastafur until 1956 when it was renamed Dashkasan. In 1963, the rayon status was eliminated and Dashkasan province was merged with Khanlar District. However, in 1965, it was split again and Dashkasan regained its administrative rayon status. There is one city, six-city type settlements and 42 villages in Dahskasan District. Dashkasan rayon shares an 8 km border with Armenia and 24.5 km border with Shamkir District, 23 km border with Kalbajar District, 41 km border with Gadabay District, 56.3 km border with Khanlar District.

== Demographics ==
=== Ethnic groups ===
Population 30,510

- Azerbaijanis - 99,5%
- Russians - 0,3%
- Others - 0,2%

=== Religion ===
- Islam - 99,8%
- Other religions - 0,2%

=== Language ===
- Azerbaijani Language 100%

=== Population ===
Population of regions by the year (at the beginning of the year, thsd. persons)
| | 2000 | 2001 | 2002 | 2003 | 2004 | 2005 | 2006 | 2007 | 2008 | 2009 | 2010 | 2011 | 2012 | 2013 | 2014 | 2015 | 2016 | 2017 | 2018 | 2019 | 2020 | 2021 |
| Dashkasan district | 30,7 | 31,0 | 31,3 | 31,5 | 31,7 | 31,9 | 32,0 | 32,3 | 32,5 | 32,7 | 32,8 | 33,2 | 33,3 | 33,5 | 33,7 | 34,1 | 34,4 | 34,8 | 35,0 | 35,1 | 35,4 | 35,4 |
| urban population | 12,7 | 12,8 | 12,9 | 13,0 | 13,2 | 13,4 | 13,4 | 13,6 | 14,1 | 14,2 | 14,3 | 14,4 | 14,4 | 14,5 | 14,6 | 14,7 | 14,9 | 15,1 | 15,2 | 15,3 | 15,3 | 15,4 |
| rural population | 18,0 | 18,2 | 18,4 | 18,5 | 18,5 | 18,5 | 18,6 | 18,7 | 18,4 | 18,5 | 18,5 | 18,8 | 18,9 | 19,0 | 19,1 | 19,4 | 19,5 | 19,7 | 19,8 | 19,8 | 20,1 | 20,0 |

== Nature ==
The district covers the Dashkasan plateau of the Lesser Caucasian Mountain range encompassing parts and tips of Shahdagh and Murovdag ranges. The highest altitudes are at Hinaldag Peak (3,367 meters) and Qoshqar Peak (3,361 meters). Part of Bashkend-Dastafur lowlands also falls in Dashkasan rayon. This part of the region is rich with cretaceous chalk. The average annual rainfall is 600–900 mm. It mostly rains during springtime. The mountains are enriched with oak forests.

There is a lot of vegetation used for curing various deceases. Among the treating plants, one can find thyme, achillea, asteraceae, stellaria, mountain viola, etc.

There are also so-called treatment springs containing pure mountain water which cleanse the internal organs.

1. Yumurtalı spring - Qabaqtəpə village;
2. Narzan spring - Yuxarı Daşkəsən settlement;
3. Turşsu spring - Alaxançallı village;
4. Qiblə spring - Qabaqtəpə kəndi;
5. Qayğı spring - Qabaqtəpə kəndi;
6. Böyrək spring - Alunitdağ settlement;
7. İdris spring - Əmirvar village;
8. Seyid spring - Xoşbulaq village.

In Dashkasan rayon, the animal habitat is rich with roe deer, goitered gazelle, Caspian red deer, West Caucasian tur, rabbit, marten, hedgehog, European badger, wild boar, Caucasian lynx, steppe wolf, Syrian brown bear, red fox, European jackal.

== Climate ==
In the Dashkasan locale the temperature changes from -5 C to -20 C in winter and from +20 C to +35 C in summer. The average annual temperature is 0–100 in Dashkaran. The average monthly temperature in January is -2-140, the average monthly temperature of July is + 5–200. Sometimes the absolute maximum temperature of the air is higher than + 20-310, the absolute minimum temperature of air is lower than 20–300 in summer. In the middle mountain range, the average absolute minimum air temperature changes from +50 to +70 during the year. The average annual soil surface temperature is + 80, the average temperature of January is -50, the average monthly July temperature is 210. The average annual relative humidity of the air is 75% and changes between 67 and 82% per year. The annual rainfalls in the area are 600–900 mm. Most of the rainfalls fall in the spring. The possible evaporation is 300–800 mm from the soil surface in a year.

== Natural resources ==
Starting from Soviet times, the region was one of the strategic centers for mining iron ore, aluminum, cobalt, marble. At the moment, gold, copper, cobalt, iron ore, marble are being mined.
