= List of people declared personae non gratae in Azerbaijan =

Until 2023, unless a visa or an official warrant was issued by Azerbaijani authorities, the government of Azerbaijan condemned any visit by foreign citizens to the self-declared Armenian breakaway state of Artsakh, its surrounding territories and the Azerbaijani enclaves of Karki, Yuxarı Əskipara, Barxudarlı and Sofulu which are de jure part of Azerbaijan, but were under Armenian control. Azerbaijan considered entering these territories through Armenia (as it was usually the case) a violation of its visa and migration policy. Foreign citizens who entered these territories would be permanently banned from entering Azerbaijan and would be included on the list of "unwelcome people" by the Ministry of Foreign Affairs of Azerbaijan.

The Ministry of Foreign Affairs of Azerbaijan has explained the matter as:

The Ministry of Foreign Affairs of the Republic of Azerbaijan would like to remind all nationals of foreign countries wishing to travel to Nagorno-Karabakh and other occupied regions of Azerbaijan that due to continuing occupation by the Armed Forces of Armenia, these areas are temporarily out of control of the Republic of Azerbaijan.

Any visit without the consent of the Republic of Azerbaijan to the above-mentioned territories, which are internationally recognized as an integral part of Azerbaijan is considered as a violation of sovereignty and territorial integrity of the Republic of Azerbaijan and as a breach of national legislation, as well as relevant norms and principles of international law.
Accordingly, the Ministry calls all foreign nationals to refrain themselves from travelling to the occupied territories in and around the Nagorno-Karabakh region of the Republic of Azerbaijan.

The Ministry would like to remind that those who traveled to the occupied territories without prior permission of the Republic of Azerbaijan will be denied the entry to the Republic of Azerbaijan. In case of necessity, appropriate legal actions will be taken with regard to these persons.

As of 10 September 2020, the list of people declared personae non gratae included 1020 people.

== List ==
=== Date unknown ===
- (United Kingdom) Caroline Cox, member of the British House of Lords
- (United Kingdom) Shreela Flather, member of the British House of Lords
- (United Kingdom) Stephen Pound, British MP
- (France) Michèle Rivasi, French Member of the European Parliament
- (France) Damien Abad, French Member of the European Parliament
- (Argentina) Eduardo Eurnekian, Argentine businessman of Armenian descent
- (Bulgaria) Tsvetana Paskaleva, Bulgarian journalist of Armenian descent
- (Russia) Aleksey Kochetkov, former director of the CIS-EMO
- (Georgia (country)) / (Russia) Alan Yelbakiyev, former adviser to the President of South Ossetia
- (United States) / (Sweden) Anastasia Taylor-Lind, reporter at The New York Times

=== 2007 ===
- (Estonia) Kaupo Känd, senior adviser to the OSCE High Commissioner
- (Serbia) Mila Alečković Nikolić, Serbian professor and member of the Writers Union
- (Canada) Dave Loewen, City Councillor of Abbotsford
- (Russia) Sergey Markedonov, Russian MP
- Valeri Spektor, President of the National Security Affairs of the Academy of Sciences of Russia
- (Russia) Sergey Glotoy, Deputy Chairman of the State Duma Committee on Regulations and Organizational Issues
- (Russia) Yelena Semerikova, Member of Russian Public Chamber
- (Russia) Rumen Batalov, Russian political scientist
- (Ukraine) Sergei Valentinovich Pughacyov, Ukrainian city council member

=== 2008 ===
- (Germany) Eckart Stratenschulte, director of the Europäische Akademie Berlin

=== 2009 ===
- (Iran) / Hamed Kazemzadeh Director of Caucasus Studies Institute and Professor in Canada

=== 2010 ===
- (Canada) Harout Chitilian, Canadian politician
- Reda Haddad, former MP from Jordan
- (Russia) Konstantin Zatulin, Russian MP
- (Russia) Maksim Mishenko, Russian MP
- (Russia) Andrey Kuraev, Russian Orthodox Priest
- (Russia) Igor Chernishenko, Russian MP
- (Russia) Kirill Cherkasov, Russian MP
- (Russia) Tatyana Volozhinskaya, Russian MP
- (Russia) Galina Ratnikova, international observer
- Andrei Areshev, expert of Strategic Culture Foundation of Russia
- (Russia) Viktor Sheyns, Russian political scientists, economist
- (Slovakia) František Mikloško, Slovak politician
- (France) François Rochebloine, French MP
- (France) Arlette Grosskost, French MP
- (France) Pascale Crozon, French MP
- Dzovinar Melkonian, Paris representative of France Institute of Democracy and Cooperation
- (France) Maurice Bonneau, independent French observer
- (France) Richard Mallie, French MP
- (France) René Rouquet, French MP
- (France) Michel Diefenbacher, French MP
- Jean-Pierre Delannoy, secretary of the France-Armenia Friendship Group
- (France) Michel Porret, French lawyer
- (France) Moris Bonno, French MP
- (Iran) Rubik Sardaryan, Iranian MP
- (Czech Republic) Martin Makdal, Czech MP
- (France) Alen Fresnel, French MP
- (Poland) Tomasz Poręba, Polish member of the European Parliament
- (Germany) Hartmut Egger, professor of Free University of Berlin
- (Belgium) Bernard Coulie, Belgian academic
- (Belgium) Fransua de Kort, Belgian academic
- (Belgium) Jean Marisa, Belgian academic
- (Belgium) Bernard Snoy, Belgian professor
- (Germany) Michael Kambek, German politician
- (Germany) Peter Schreiner, German academic
- (Russia) Alexandra Vorontsova, Russian politician
- (Russia) Sergey Popov, Russian politician
- Michael Kovak, head of the Netherlands-US mission
- (United Kingdom) Gordon Marsden, British MP
- (Greece) Anastasios Nerantzis, Greek MP
- (Czech Republic) Martin Mahdal, Czech film director
- Rubik Sardarian, member of Iran-Armenia friendship union
- Mirghassem Momeni, member of Iran-Armenia Friendship society
- Jose Arbo, parliamentarian from Argentina
- Sergio Nahabetian, former parliamentarian from Argentina of Armenian descent

=== 2011 ===
- (Russia) Sergei Buntman, Russian journalist
- (Russia) Yuri Snigirev, Russian journalist of Izvestia
- (Russia) Yuri Vasiliyev, Russian painter
- (Russia) Valeri Obedkov, Russian painter
- (Russia) / (United States) Diana Markosian, U.S. and Russian photojournalist of Armenian descent
- (Russia) / (Israel) Alexander Lapshin, Russian-Israeli blogger
- (Belgium) Stephan Vermeersch, musician
- (United Kingdom) John Whittingdale, British MP
- (United States) Will Englund, correspondent for The Washington Post
- (United States) Joe Simitian, California senator of Armenian descent
- (Northern Cyprus) Kutlay Erk, Turkish Cypriot politician
- (Northern Cyprus) Emine Çolak, Turkish Cypriot politician
- (Northern Cyprus) Meltem Samani, Turkish Cypriot historian and peace activist
- (Lithuania) Tomas Ladiga, Lithuanian musician
- (Singapore) Abigail Sin, Singaporean musician
- (France) Valérie Boyer, French MP
- (France) Guy Teissier French MP
- (France) Jacques Remiller, French MP
- (France) Georges Colombier, French MP
- (France) Alain Néri, French MP

=== 2012 ===
- (Australia) Walt Secord, Australian politician
- (Bulgaria) Pavel Chernev, Bulgarian politician and lawyer
- (Canada) Jim Karygiannis, Canadian MP
- (Georgia (country)) Makvala Gonashvili, chairman of the Georgian Writers Union
- (Romania) Marius Chelaru, Romanian poet
- (France) Philippe Marini, French Senator
- (France) Sophie Joissains, French Senator
- (France) Bernard Fournier, French Senator
- (United States) Charles Duke, US astronaut and Air Force brigadier general
- Claude Nicollier, the first astronaut from Switzerland
- (Switzerland) Meinrad Schade, Swiss photographer
- (Switzerland) Ueli Leuenberger, Swiss MP
- (Switzerland) Luc Barthassat, Swiss MP
- (Switzerland) Dominique de Buman, Swiss MP
- (United States) Keith David Watenpaugh, American historian and professor
- (Germany) Otto Luchterhandt, legal expert
- (Germany) Hans-Jürgen Zahorka, German Member of European Parliament
- (Greece) Nikos Lygeros, Greek academic
- (Russia) Aleksandr Balberov, Russian MP
- (Russia) Aleksei Martynov, Russian Director of Institute of New States
- Denis Dvornikov, Member of the Public Chamber of Russia
- (Russia) Ivan Sukharev, Russian MP
- (Russia) Stanislav Tarasov, Russian journalist
- (Russia) Vitali Skripchenko, Russian writer
- (Netherlands) Daniël van der Stoep, Dutch member of the European Parliament
- (Denmark) Gert Laursen, Danish information technology specialist
- (Poland) Mateusz Piskorski, Polish politician
- (Uruguay) Jorge Orrico, Uruguayan MP
- (Uruguay) Rubén Martínez Huelmo, Uruguayan senator
- (Uruguay) Ricardo Planchón Geymonat, Uruguayan MP
- (Uruguay) Richard Sander, Uruguayan MP
- (Uruguay) Daniel Radio, Uruguayan MP

=== 2013 ===
- (Bulgaria) / (Russia) Bedros Kirkorov, Bulgarian-Russian singer of Armenian descent
- (Russia) Anna Chapman, Russian journalist and agent
- (Spain) Montserrat Caballé, Spanish opera singer
- (Austria) Ewald Stadler, Austrian member of the European Parliament
- (Cyprus) Eleni Theocharous, Cypriot member of the European Parliament
- (Cyprus) Kyriacos Triantaphyllides, Cypriot member of the European Parliament
- (Georgia (country)) David Turashvili, Georgian writer and playwright
- (Georgia (country)) Beso Khvedelidze, Georgian writer
- (Germany) Matthias Wilkes, German mayor
- (Australia) Jonathan O'Dea, Australian MLC
- (Australia) Marie Ficarra, Australian MLC
- (Australia) Gladys Berejiklian, Premier of New South Wales
- (Australia) Amanda Fazio, Australian MLC
- (Australia) Fred Nile, Australian MLC
- (Australia) David Clarke, Australian MLC
- (United Kingdom) Russell Pollard, photojournalist
- (United States) William Zartman, American professor
- (United States) Terrence Hopmann, American professor
- (United States) John Pérez, Speaker of the California State Assembly
- (United States) Bob Blumenfield, Member of the Los Angeles City Council
- (Italy) Milena Gabanelli, Italian journalist

=== 2014 ===
- (Russia) Anastasia Karimova, Russian journalist
- (Russia) Alexander Shmelev, Russian journalist
- (Russia) Alisa Ganieva, writer-journalist
- (Russia) Dmitry Bavyrin, Russian journalist
- (Russia) Marina Skorikova, Russian journalist
- (Russia) Svetlana Shmeleva, Russian journalist
- (France) Alain Néri, French MP

=== 2015 ===
- (Russia) Lyubov Kazarnovskaya, Russian opera singer

=== 2016 ===
- (Italy) Antonia Arslan, Italian writer
- John Marshall Evans, former United States ambassador to Armenia

=== 2017 ===
- (Portugal) Rubina Berardo, Member of the Assembly of the Republic
- (United States) Anthony Bourdain, TV personality and chef
- (United States) Tulsi Gabbard, former member of the U.S. House of Representatives and current U.S. Director of National Intelligence
- (United States) Frank Pallone, member of the U.S. House of Representatives
- (United States) David Valadao, member of the U.S. House of Representatives

=== 2019 ===
- (Germany) Martin Sonneborn, Member of the European Parliament
- (Switzerland) Ronnie Grob, journalist, editor-in-chief at Swiss monthly magazine Schweizer Monat

=== 2020 ===
- (Germany) Harald Maass, Cicero magazine correspondent
- (Switzerland) Lukas Rühli, journalist at Schweizer Monat
- (Switzerland) Stephan Bader, journalist at Schweizer Monat
- (Switzerland) Stephan Rindlisbacher, journalist at Schweizer Monat
- (United Kingdom) Miles Howthorn, Director of the HALO Trust program in the occupied territories of Karabakh

=== 2024 ===
- (Russia) Nikolai Valuev, Member of the Russian State Duma
- (Greece) Theodoros Roussopoulos, President of the Parliamentary Assembly of the Council of Europe

=== Removed from the list ===
The names of certain people initially declared personae non gratae were taken out of the list following formal requests and apologies on their part.

- (Turkey) Nagehan Alçı, Turkish journalist of Akşam, was blacklisted in 2009 after a two-day visit to Nagorno-Karabakh for research purposes. It was reported that she had referred to Nagorno-Karabakh as "100% Armenian land" in an interview on a television channel broadcast in Nagorno-Karabakh Alçı later denied making such a statement, saying she had never mentioned the history of the region at all. In 2013, she sent a request to the Azerbaijani government asking to exclude her from the "black list" and reaffirming her support of the territorial integrity of "brotherly Azerbaijan". Her request was granted in December 2013.
- (Russia) Aleksey Mitrofanov, Russian politician, was blacklisted in 2011 for attending the opening ceremony of a banquet hall in Stepanakert. In a letter to the Azerbaijani foreign ministry, he expressed "sincere regret" for having visited Nagorno-Karabakh. The ban on his entry to Azerbaijan was lifted in September 2013.
- (United States) James Brooke, an American journalist blacklisted in 2011, was taken down from the list around the same time.
- (Italy) Al Bano, Italian singer, was declared persona non grata in 2010, after giving a concert in Nagorno-Karabakh. In November 2013, the ban was lifted, after a letter was sent by Al Bano to the Azerbaijani foreign ministry in which stated he had had no information about the situation around Nagorno-Karabakh at the time of his visit. In December 2013, Al Bano visited Azerbaijan together with other Italian pop stars of the 1970s and performed at a joint concert.
- (Germany) Jürgen Klimke, member of the German Parliament, was on the list since September 2013, after holding a meeting with members of the Armenian community of Nagorno-Karabakh in Stepanakert. In his letter to the Azerbaijani government, Klimke said his visit had been unplanned and he had no idea of its repercussions. He voiced his support for Azerbaijan's territorial integrity and expressed regret with regard to his visit. His name did not appear on the list as of 17 March 2014.
- (Moldova) Constantin Moscovici, Moldovan singer, was excluded from the list in February 2014, after he stated in a letter that his visit to Nagorno-Karabakh was not deliberate and that his position on the territorial integrity of Azerbaijan coincided with that of his country.
- Artemy Lebedev, Russian designer and businessman, was removed from the list in February 2015 after a letter of apology sent to the Azerbaijani ambassador in Russia. In his LiveJournal account, Lebedev wrote that five years prior he had done "a foolish thing" by visiting Nagorno-Karabakh without having done enough research and without a special permission from Azerbaijan. He called on others to obtain one if they ever decide to visit the region.
- (Argentina) Luis Faraoni, sub-editor of the newspaper Tiempo Argentino, was excluded from the list in April 2015, after expressing regret for visiting Nagorno-Karabakh and voicing his support for the territorial integrity of Azerbaijan in a letter addressed to the Ministry of Foreign Affairs of Azerbaijan.
- (Sweden) Swedish diplomat and former EU special representative in the South Caucasus Peter Semneby was excluded from the list in April 2015. According to the spokesperson of the Azerbaijan Ministry of Foreign Affairs, Semneby had said in a letter sent to the Ministry that his unauthorised trip to Nagorno-Karabakh had enabled him to conclude that his opinion on the conflict in fact coincided with that of Azerbaijan. Semneby refused to comment on the fact that he had been blacklisted from 2012 to 2015.
- The names of (Switzerland) Yannick Pelletier and (Republic of Ireland) Kevin O'Connell were removed from the list in the wake of the 42nd Chess Olympiad held in Baku, after official letters were submitted on their part to the Ministry of Foreign Affairs of Azerbaijan which the Ministry quoted as expressing regret for visiting the occupied territories of Azerbaijan and reaffirming Azerbaijan's territorial integrity.

== Reaction ==
=== Azerbaijan ===
Official

Foreign Ministry of Azerbaijan spokesman Elman Abdullayev said the list is incomplete due to an ongoing investigation of more potential entry violations. Abdullayev also claimed that "if the person who visited the occupied territories of Azerbaijan without the permission of the Azerbaijani side, regrets his actions, aware of the illegality of his visit and will appeal to the relevant authorities of Azerbaijan with an explanation, the Azerbaijani side is willing to consider this appeal on the exclusion of that person from the list."

Non-official

Investigative journalist and radio reporter Khadija Ismayilova, known for her anti-government publications, has noted that some of the people whose names appear on the list, especially those for whom no reason for the ban has been listed, are in fact journalists and human rights activists who apparently were barred from entering Azerbaijan for criticising the Azerbaijani government in their articles, as it was not evident if they had ever visited Nagorno-Karabakh.

=== Armenia and Nagorno-Karabakh ===
The Ministry of Foreign Affairs of the former Nagorno-Karabakh Republic criticized the Azerbaijan stance in 2013, stating:

Azerbaijan replaces the conflict settlement process with attempts to transfer the issue to the auspice of the UN, Council of Europe, European Parliament, and other international organizations. Meanwhile, the Azerbaijani party's requirement for the international organizations, states, and political figures to recognize the territorial integrity of Azerbaijan grows into a political farce and its declaration of the citizens visiting the NKR "persona non grata" – into a comedy. The position of Azerbaijan is fully deprived of even hints of readiness for any compromise or concessions. This reconfirms the fact that official Baku doesn't want to resolve the Karabakh issue, trying to shift the blame for the failure onto Armenia.

=== International ===
Official

Following Azerbaijan's protests, governments of some countries whose citizens visited the occupied territory, as well as establishments that they were affiliated with at the time of the visit, described these visits as "personal decisions" of the said individuals and stated that those visits did not represent their official position.

The US State Department Bureau of Consular Affairs website states that "traveling to the region of Nagorno-Karabakh and the surrounding occupied areas via Armenia without the consent of the Government of Azerbaijan could make you ineligible to travel to Azerbaijan in the future."

Non-official

François Rochebloine, Member of the French National Assembly and the head of the France-Armenia Friendship Group, commented on the Azerbaijani decision to ban his entrance to Azerbaijan, stating that it is an "honor" for him to be declared persona non grata in Azerbaijan.

Ueli Leuenberger, a Swiss Member of Parliament, has stated that he is "grateful" for being blacklisted from Azerbaijan.

The Spanish opera singer Montserrat Caballé visited the Nagorno-Karabakh Republic on 4 June 2013. She met the primate of the Diocese of Artsakh, archbishop Pargev Martirosyan, in Shushi's Ghazanchetsots Cathedral. She also visited Gandzasar and Stepanakert, the capital of the Nagorno-Karabakh Republic, where she met with President Bako Sahakyan. On 6 June 2013, the Azerbaijani government declared Caballé persona non grata. On 9 June 2013, the President of Armenia, Serzh Sargsyan, awarded Caballé the Armenian Medal of Honor.

Russian political expert Konstantin Zatulin, who repeatedly travelled to Nagorno-Karabakh to observe elections in the self-declared state, noted that "Azerbaijan demonstrates silliness" by having such a list, while his colleague Sergey Markedonov sarcastically expressed his happiness to have joined the company of Caballe and other celebrities.

According to Russian-Israeli blogger Alexander Lapshin, who is included in the list, "Azerbaijani position towards Armenians is too complicated and Azerbaijanis themselves can not explain the approach of their government."

Wayne Merry, a retired American diplomat and the senior fellow for Europe and Eurasia at the American Foreign Policy Council, condemned the Azerbaijani government and said that "this step first of all harms the Azerbaijani authorities" and it is a "striking example of self-isolation and simple policy."

Argentinian journalist Marcelo Cantelmi who was blacklisted in 2005 wrote: "publishing a blacklist is a despicable and barbaric act. It is a discriminatory method, historically used by dictators and tyrants, that intends to punish divergent opinions in a brutal manner".

Nicholas Wondra, an expert on Caucasus, was found himself in the Azerbaijani "black list" although he has never been in Karabakh. He added that "as far as I have been included in the list, now I must visit Karabakh as an expert on Caucasus."

Zafer Noyan, an ethnic Turkish arm-wrestler, was barred from entering Azerbaijan because his last name resembled that of an Armenian.

Syrian American journalist of Armenian descent Harut Sassounian in an article written in August 2013 stated that "Baku’s Blacklist of Artsakh Visitors Helps Armenia, Hurts Azerbaijan". He added, "Azerbaijan’s leaders may not be aware that some of their incompetent underlings are causing great harm to the interests and reputation of their own country."
