= Visa policy of Azerbaijan =

Policy on permits required to enter Azerbaijan

Republic of Azerbaijan
- Azerbaijan
- Policy of: Azerbaijan
- Area: 86,600 km^{2} (33,400 sq mi)
- Population: 10,353,296

Visitors to Azerbaijan must obtain a visa from one of the Azerbaijani diplomatic missions unless they are citizens of one of the visa-exempt countries, or citizens eligible for an electronic visa on arrival, or citizens eligible for an e-Visa.

All visitors must have a passport valid for at least 3 months.

Azerbaijan's visa and other migration policies are also implemented in accordance with the mobility rights arrangements within the Commonwealth of Independent States.

== Overview ==
The applicant's passport must be valid for at least 3 months longer than the expected validity period of the visa requested.

If the applicant's passport has less than 3 months remaining before the expiry date, the visa will not be issued.

All entrants who plan to stay for more than 15 days are required to register their location with the State Migration Service on arrival (except citizens of Kazakhstan, who are only required to register if they intend to stay more than 30 days).

== Visa policy map ==
Visa policy of Azerbaijan Azerbaijan Visa not required - may enter with ID card (90 days) Visa not required (90 days) Visa not required (30 days) Visa on arrival / eVisa eVisa Visa required Admission refused

== Visa exemption ==
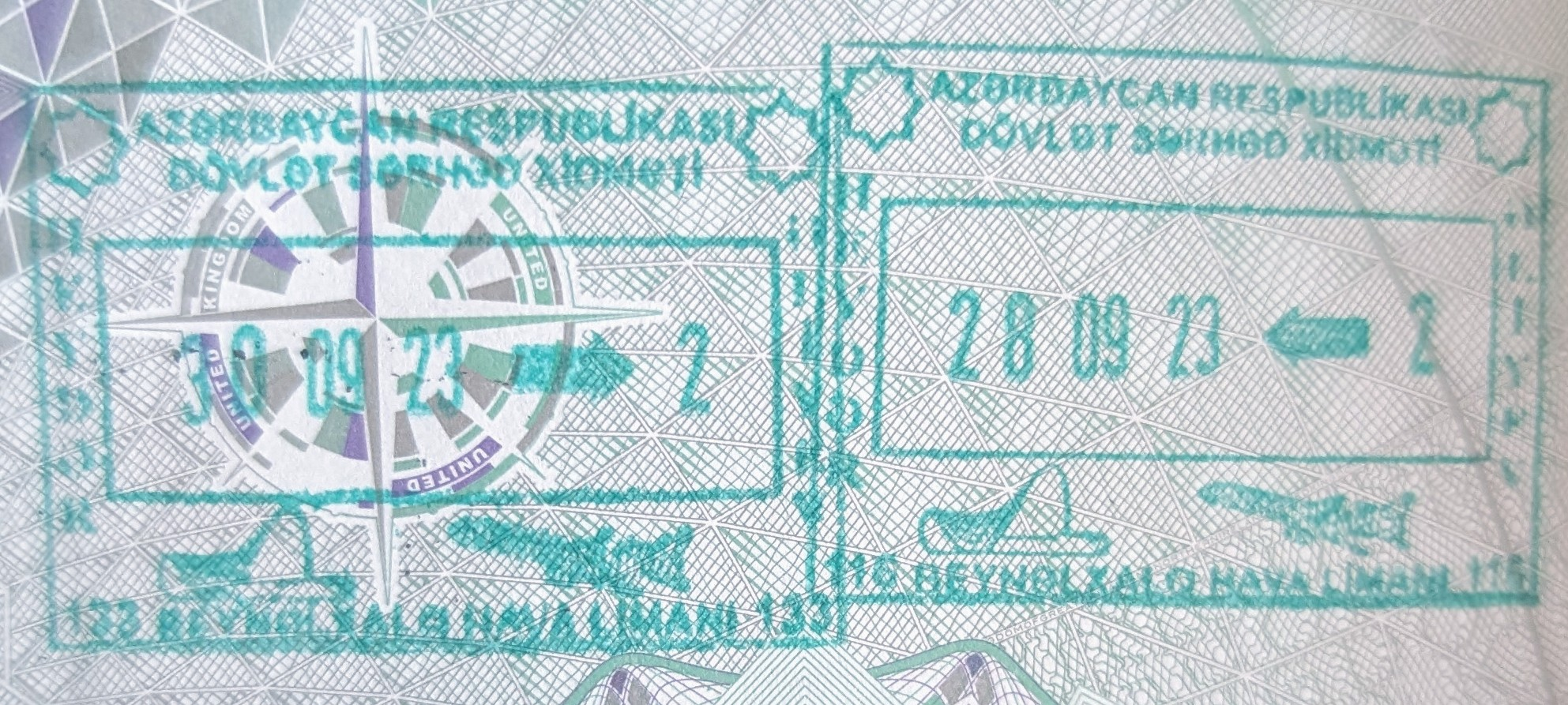
A pair of Azerbaijani entry (right) and exit (left) stamps in a British passport

=== Ordinary passports ===
Holders of ordinary passports of the following countries may enter Azerbaijan without a visa for the following period:

90 days

- Albania^{1}
- Belarus
- Georgia
- Kazakhstan
- Kyrgyzstan
- Maldives
- Moldova
- Morocco
- Russia^{2}
- Serbia^{1}
- Tajikistan
- Turkey^{ID} ^{1}
- Ukraine
- United Arab Emirates^{1}
- Uzbekistan

30 days

- Bosnia and Herzegovina^{T4}
- Bahrain^{T2}
- China^{A} ^{1}
- Hong Kong^{A} ^{T1}
- Japan^{T3}
- Kuwait^{T2}
- Oman^{T2}
- Macau^{A} ^{T1}
- Qatar
- Saudi Arabia^{T2}
- Singapore^{T4}
- South Korea^{T3}

_{ID - May enter with an ID card in lieu of a passport if arriving directly from Turkey.}
_{A - For Chinese citizens with People's Republic of China passports, Hong Kong Special Administrative Region passports or Macao Special Administrative Region passports only.}
_{T1 - Temporary measure from 2 February 2026 until 2 February 2027.}
_{T2 - Temporary measure from 15 February 2026 until 15 February 2027, at most 3 visa-free visits.}
_{T3 - Temporary measure from 1 July 2026 until 1 July 2027, at most 3 visa-free visits.}
_{T4 - Temporary measure from 1 August 2026 until 1 August 2027, at most 3 visa-free visits.}
_{1 - No more than 90 days within any 180-day period.}
_{2 - No more than 90 days within 1 calendar year period.}

Date of visa changes

Citizens of Belarus, Georgia, Kazakhstan, Kyrgyzstan, Moldova, Russia, Tajikistan, Ukraine, Uzbekistan have never required a visa to enter Azerbaijan.

- 1 September 2019: Turkey
- November 2021: Qatar
- 8 July 2023: United Arab Emirates
- 21 November 2023: Serbia
- 23 April 2024: Albania
- 28 August 2024: Morocco
- 20 July 2025: China
- 29 April 2026: Maldives

Cancelled:

- 1992: Armenia
- 1993: Bulgaria, Cuba, Czechia, Hungary, Mongolia, Poland, Romania, Slovakia, Vietnam
- 1995: Estonia, Latvia, Lithuania
- 1999: Turkmenistan

=== Non-ordinary passports ===
Azerbaijan Diplomatic, official, service or special passports Diplomatic passports Temporarily suspended Admission refused

Holders of diplomatic, official, service or special passports of the following countries and territories may enter Azerbaijan without a visa for up to 90 days (unless otherwise noted):

- Albania^{D S}
- Algeria^{D S}
- Argentina^{D O S}
- Austria^{D S}
- Bahrain^{D}
- Belarus^{D O S}
- Belgium^{D}
- Bolivia^{D O S}
- Bosnia and Herzegovina^{1 D O S}
- Brazil^{D O S}
- Bulgaria^{D S}
- Cambodia^{D}
- Chile^{D O S}
- China^{1 D S PA}
- Colombia^{D O S}
- Costa Rica^{D S}
- Croatia^{D S}
- Cuba^{D O S}
- Cyprus^{D}
- Czech Republic^{D}
- Djibouti^{D S}
- Egypt^{1 D S Sp}
- Estonia^{D}
- Finland^{D}
- France^{D}
- Gambia^{D}
- Georgia^{D O S}
- Germany^{D}
- Greece^{D}
- Hong Kong^{2 D S}
- Hungary^{D}
- India^{D O S}
- Indonesia^{1 D S}
- Iran^{1 D S}
- Iraq^{1 D O S}
- Israel^{D S}
- Italy^{D S}
- Japan^{D}
- Jordan^{D S}
- Kazakhstan^{D O S}
- Kuwait^{D S Sp}
- Kyrgyzstan^{D O S}
- Laos^{1 D}
- Latvia^{D S}
- Libya^{3 D S Sp}
- Liechtenstein^{D}
- Lithuania^{D S}
- Luxembourg^{D}
- Malta^{D}
- Malaysia^{1 D O S}
- Maldives^{D O S}
- Mexico^{D}
- Moldova^{D O S}
- Mongolia^{D O S}
- Montenegro^{D S}
- Morocco^{D O S Sp}
- Netherlands^{D}
- North Macedonia^{D S}
- Norway^{D}
- Oman^{D S Sp}
- Pakistan^{1 D S}
- Palestine^{1 D}
- Peru^{D S Sp}
- Poland^{D}
- Portugal^{D S Sp}
- Qatar^{1 D S Sp}
- Paraguay^{D O S}
- Romania^{D S}
- Russia^{D O S}
- Rwanda^{D S}
- San Marino^{D S}
- Saudi Arabia^{D S}
- Serbia^{D O S}
- Singapore^{D O S}
- Slovakia^{D S}
- Slovenia^{D S}
- South Korea^{1 D O S}
- Spain^{D}
- Sweden^{D}
- Switzerland^{D S}
- Syria^{1 D S Sp}
- Tajikistan^{D O S}
- Turkey^{D S Sp}
- Turkmenistan^{1 D S}
- Ukraine^{D O S}
- United Arab Emirates^{D S Sp}
- Uruguay^{D O S}
- Uzbekistan^{D O S}
- Venezuela^{1 D O S}
- Vietnam^{1 D O S}

_{D - Diplomatic passports}
_{O - Official passports}
_{S - Service passports}
_{Sp - Special passports}
_{PA - Passports endorsed for "public affairs"}
_{1 – 30 days}
_{2 – 14 days}
_{3 - Temporarily suspended.}

=== Future changes ===
Azerbaijan has signed visa exemption agreements with the following countries, but they have not yet been ratified:

Country	Passports	Agreement signed on
Antigua and Barbuda	All	24 September 2026
Benin	Diplomatic, service	24 September 2026
Dominican Republic	Ordinary	24 September 2026
Saint Kitts and Nevis	Ordinary	24 September 2026
Bangladesh	Diplomatic, official, service	23 September 2026
Colombia	Ordinary	23 September 2026
Jordan	Ordinary	8 July 2026

== Visa on arrival ==
Citizens of the following countries may obtain an electronic visa, valid for a maximum stay of 30 days, on arrival at any international airport:

- Bahrain^{*}
- China^{*}
- Indonesia
- Israel
- Japan^{*}
- Kuwait^{*}
- Malaysia
- Oman^{*}
- Saudi Arabia^{*}
- Singapore^{*}
- South Korea^{*}

_{* - Visa-exempt in general.}

The cost of an electronic visa on arrival is 30 USD, except for nationals of Japan, who are exempt from visa fees.

Citizens of the United States could formerly obtain a visa on arrival in Azerbaijan if arriving on a direct flight from New York City, valid for a maximum stay of 30 days. As of 2024, no airline operates direct flights between New York and Baku, so U.S citizens are not eligible to obtain a visa on arrival unless they meet another condition.

=== Conditional visa on arrival ===
- Citizens with a residence visa issued by the United Arab Emirates may obtain a 30-day tourist visa on arrival in Azerbaijan. They must present their valid visa or residence permit along with their passport.
- Citizens with a valid permanent residence card issued by any country of the Gulf Cooperation Council (GCC) may obtain a 30-day tourist visa on arrival. They must present their valid residence permit along with their passport.
- Travellers holding a letter of consent from the State Migration Service may obtain a visa on arrival in Azerbaijan.

== Electronic visa (e-Visa) ==
ASAN Viza
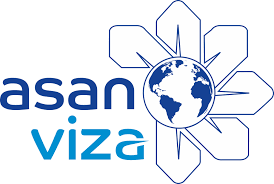

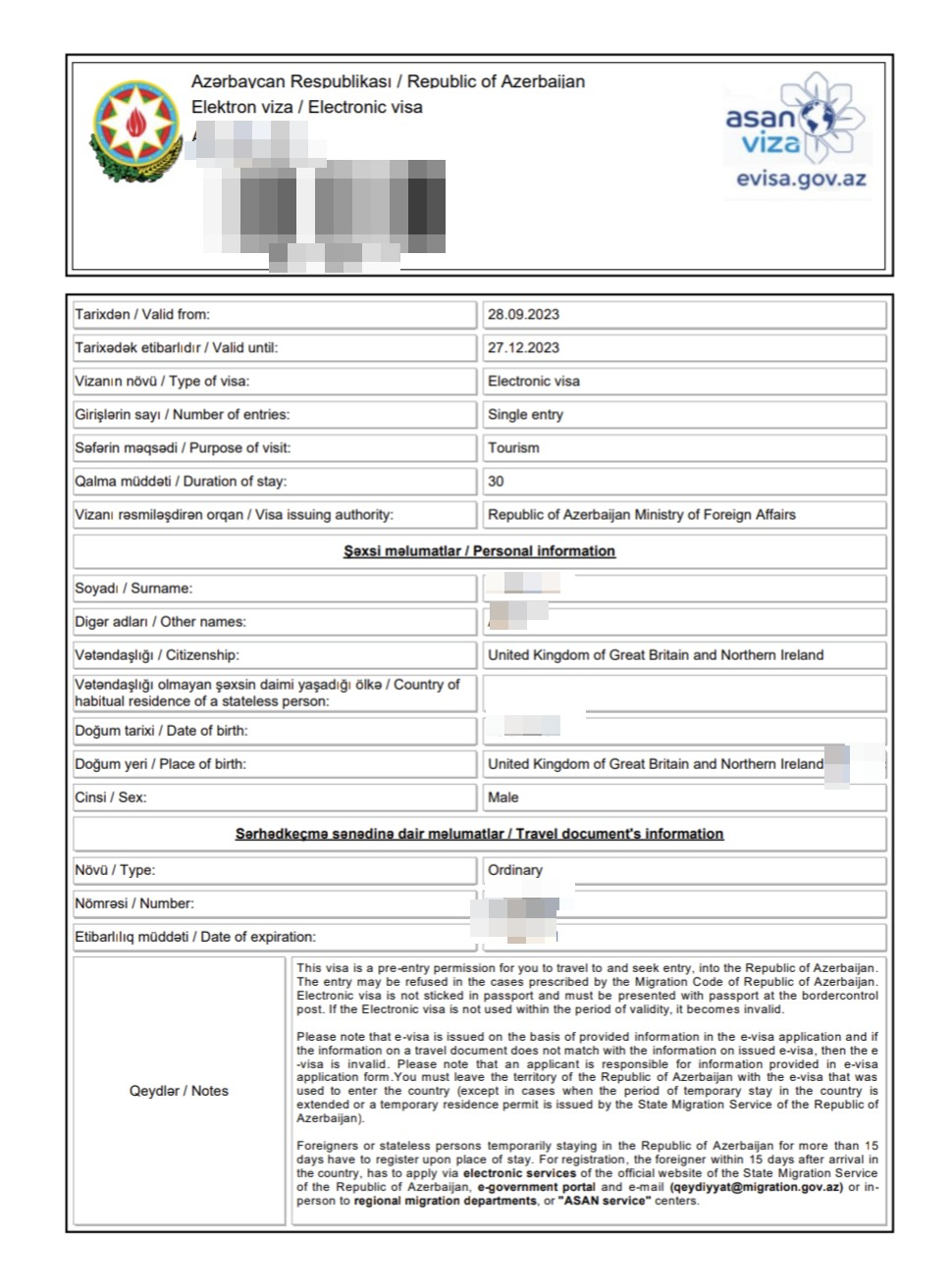
- Sample of Azerbaijan electronic visa
- Owner: State Migration Service
- Website: evisa.gov.az

Azerbaijan introduced an e-Visa in January 2017. The system is known as the ASAN viza and visas are issued for a single-entry visit of up to 30 days. The e-visa should be printed and presented together with the visitor's passport (which must be valid for at least three months beyond the expiry date of the visa) at the border checkpoint.

There are two types of e-Visa application: a standard application, which costs 25 USD and takes up to 3 working days, and an urgent application, which costs 60 USD and is processed within 3 hours, in both cases including an unavoidable 5 USD "service fee".

Citizens of the following countries and territories may obtain an e-Visa:

- All European Union member states
- All European Free Trade Association member states

- Algeria
- Andorra
- Argentina
- Australia
- Bahamas
- Bahrain^{*}
- Barbados
- Bolivia
- Bosnia and Herzegovina^{*}
- Brazil
- Brunei
- Canada
- Chile
- Colombia
- Costa Rica
- Cuba
- Djibouti
- Ecuador
- Guatemala
- Honduras
- India
- Indonesia
- Iran
- Israel
- Jamaica
- Japan^{*}
- Jordan
- Kuwait^{*}
- Malaysia
- Mauritius
- Mexico
- Monaco
- Mongolia
- Montenegro
- Nepal
- New Zealand
- North Macedonia
- Oman^{*}
- Pakistan
- Panama
- Paraguay
- Peru
- San Marino
- Saudi Arabia
- Seychelles
- Singapore^{*}
- South Africa
- South Korea^{*}
- Sri Lanka
- Thailand
- Trinidad and Tobago
- Turkmenistan
- United Kingdom
- United States
- Vatican City
- Vietnam

_{* - Visa-exempt in general.}

In 2017, British travel magazine Wanderlust rated Azerbaijan's electronic visa as the easiest visa to obtain in the world.

There are plans to expand the ASAN system to issue electronic visas for Azerbaijani citizens traveling abroad. Negotiations are underway with Lithuania.

== Visa required in advance ==
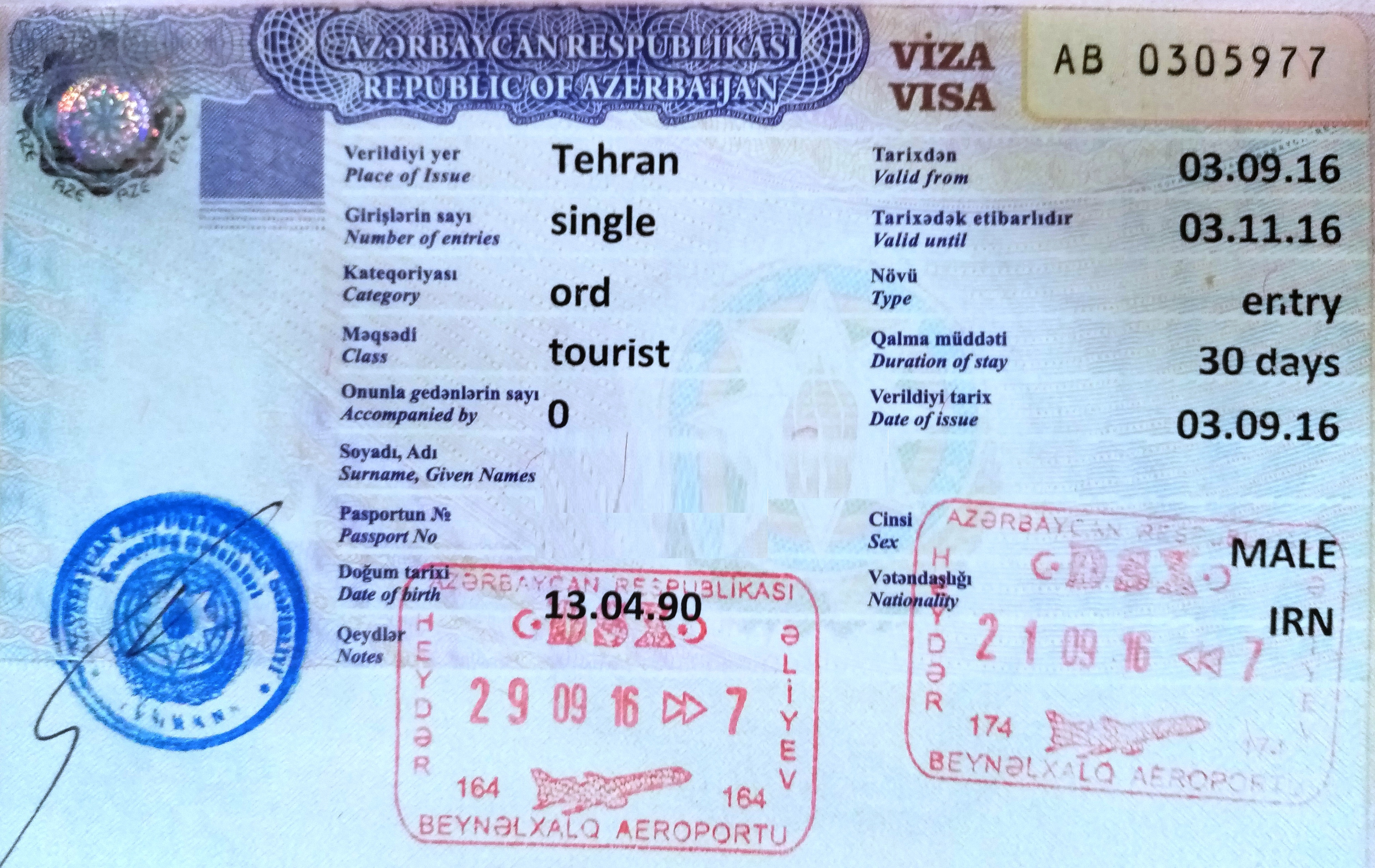
Azerbaijan visa issued in Tehran, Iran

=== Standard process ===
If a traveler does not meet the citizenship requirements for a visa exemption, visa on arrival, or electronic visa or wishes to work or study, they must apply for a physical visa with their nearest Azerbaijani diplomatic mission. Visitors may apply by mail or appointment, and the application form may be filled out online, however the process itself must be conducted physically at an embassy or consulate of Azerbaijan.

Single-entry and transit visas cost 20 USD and multiple-entry visas cost 250 USD.

When applying for a visa, the applicant must present the following:

- A completed application form
- A valid travel document and a photocopy of its information page
- Two color, passport-regulation photographs
- Proof of legal status in the country of application, if applying from a country other than one's own
- Payment for visa application fees (by certified check)

=== Invitation ===
In addition, for all visas except transit visas, the applicant must present a valid invitation. The required invitational documents differ depending on the type of visa applied for. For tourist visas, the applicant must provide proof of a hotel booking within Azerbaijan and confirmed flights in and out of the country. For private visit visas, the applicant's host in Azerbaijan must provide a notarized copy of both their identity card and an invitation letter. For all other visa types, they must receive permission from the Ministry of Foreign Affairs before applying for a visa.

To obtain permission, the inviting party in Azerbaijan must file the following documents in person at the MFA office in Baku:

- A completed application form (available online)
- A letter from the inviting person or organization stating the purpose of the visa sought after, the length of the invitation, the number of required entries, and the diplomatic mission that the invitee will apply for a visa from
- A copy of the passport of the invitee
- Proof of payment of the ₼4 application fee, paid through a bank or online

If a legal representative submits the documents, they must also provide proof of the power of attorney and a copy of their identity card. If the inviting party is an individual, they must also present a copy of their tax number registration letter and proof of address.

== Visa facilitation ==
In 2013, Azerbaijan concluded a visa facilitation agreement with the European Union (excluding Ireland) which reduces the number of documents required to justify the purpose of the trip, provides for the issuance of multiple-entry visas, limits the processing time and reduces or eliminates fees for many categories of European Union citizens.

== Admission restrictions ==
Due to the state of war with Armenia, Azerbaijan prohibits entry and transit to citizens of Armenia and other countries of Armenian descent. Exceptions have been made during certain high-profile international events, such as the Europa League.

The Government of Azerbaijan strictly prohibits the entry and transit of foreign citizens to the exclaves of Karki, Yuxarı Əskipara, Barxudarlı and Sofulu, which are de jure part of Azerbaijan but under the control of Armenia, without the prior consent of the Government of Azerbaijan.

Foreign citizens who entered these territories without permission may be denied entry and transit to Azerbaijan and may be included in the "list of persona non grata".

Entry and transit is refused to citizens of Kosovo, even if not leaving the aircraft and proceeding by the same flight. Azerbaijan also does not recognize the passports of Abkhazia, the Sahrawi Republic, Somaliland, South Ossetia, and Transnistria.

== Visitor statistics ==
Year	Visitors
1992—2001	No data
2002	▲576,000
2003	▲768,000
2004	▲989,000
2005	▼693,000
2006	▲682,000
2007	▲732,000
2008	▲1,043,000
2009	▼1,005,000
2010	▲1,280,000
2011	▲1,562,000
2012	▲1,986,000
2013	▲2,130,000
2014	▲2,160,000
2015	▼1,922,000
2016	▲2,044,000
2017	▲2,454,000
2018	▲2,635,000
2019	▲3,170,000
2020	▼796,000
2021	▼792,000
Total (2002—2021)	29,418,000

Most visitors arriving in Azerbaijan were from the following countries of nationality:

Country	2021	2020
Russia	▲258,315	225,201
Turkey	▲197,907	160,504
Iran	▲125,358	72,783
Georgia	▼62,666	184,228
Ukraine	▲17,428	16,953
UAE	▲17,320	7,951
United Kingdom	▲9,428	7,051
Saudi Arabia	▼8,834	11,945
Kazakhstan	▼6,928	8,498
Israel	▲6,655	4,238
Germany	▲5,922	3,531
Belarus	▼5,730	6,036
India	▼5,117	12,731
United States	▲4,409	2,604
Uzbekistan	▼4,213	5,283
Italy	▲3,498	2,820
Poland	▲3,331	1,198
Pakistan	▼3,224	8,752
Iraq	▼3,212	6,119
Japan	▲3,081	2,201
Turkmenistan	▼2,738	8,257
France	▼2,278	1,506
China	▲1,781	1,532
South Korea	▼413	681
(United Nations) Other countries and Statelessness	▼27,121	167,284
Total	▼791,751	795,722

== See also ==
- Azerbaijani passport
- Travel visa
- Visa requirements for Azerbaijani citizens
