= Driving licence in Azerbaijan =

Azerbaijani driving licence
- Example of a driving licence issued in Azerbaijan since 2013. (Front)

- (Reverse)
- Type: Driving licence
- Issued by: Azerbaijan
- Purpose: Authorisation

Driving licence in Azerbaijan is a document affirming the right to oversee the pertinent categories of vehicles within the domain of the Republic of Azerbaijan. It is given to people who have come to the required minimum age, who have appropriate health condition, who know the rules of the road of the Azerbaijan Republic. This right can be restricted in case of termination of the driving licence, breaking of traffic rules, the detection of illness or physical defects.

== Content ==
Irrespective of the type, on each driving licence, there is distinctive mark of Azerbaijan Republic in international traffic - "AZ" and the following numbered data:

- Surname of the bearer
- Name and patronymic of the bearer;
- Date and place of birth of the bearer;
- Place of residence of the bearer;
- Name of the issuing body;
- Date and place of issue;
- Expiry date of the licence;
- Licence number;
- Official's signature, stamp or seal of the issuing body;
- Blood group and signature of the bearer;
- Special remarks

== Minimum age ==
Depending on the type of vehicle the right for driving vehicles on Azerbaijani roads is allowed to:

| Type of vehicle | Age |
|---|---|
| bicycle | 14 years old |
| moped and motorcycle | 16 years old |
| car, not more than 8 seats | 18 years old |
| car, with more than 8 seats (for military personnel) | 19 years old |
| tram | 20 years |
| trolley bus | 21 years old |
| car, more than 8 seats | 21 years old |

== Driving licence categories ==
Since 2013 there are 7 categories that require a driving licence:

- A: any type of motorbike
- B: motorised vehicle under 3.5 tons (optionally with light trailer)
- C: motorised vehicle over 3.5 tons (optionally with light trailer, up to 750 kg)
- D: bus (has more than 8 passenger seats) (optionally with light trailer, up to 750 kg)
- BE: motorised vehicle under 3.5 tons with heavy trailer
- CE: motorised vehicle over 3.5 tons with heavy trailer
- DE: bus with heavy trailer

The legal driving age within the Azerbaijan republic is 14 years for a bicycle or a cart, 16 for A1 category vehicles, 18 for A, B & C categories, 19 for BE category, 21 for CE and D categories and 24 for DE category. Military servants may get the right to drive “CE”, “D” and “DE” category vehicles from the age of 19 as specified by the legislation.

== Gallery ==
Driving licence (front side). After 2013

Driving licence (reverse side). After 2013

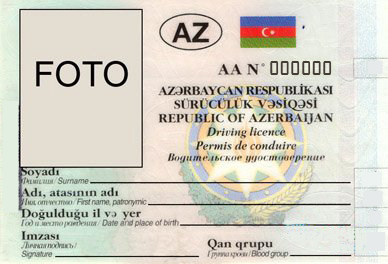
Driving licence (front side). Before 2013

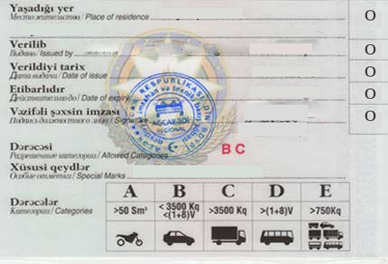
Driving licence (reverse side). Before 2013

== See also ==
- Azerbaijan identity card
- Azerbaijani passport
- Vehicle registration plates of Azerbaijan
