= Visa requirements for Azerbaijani citizens =

Administrative entry restrictions

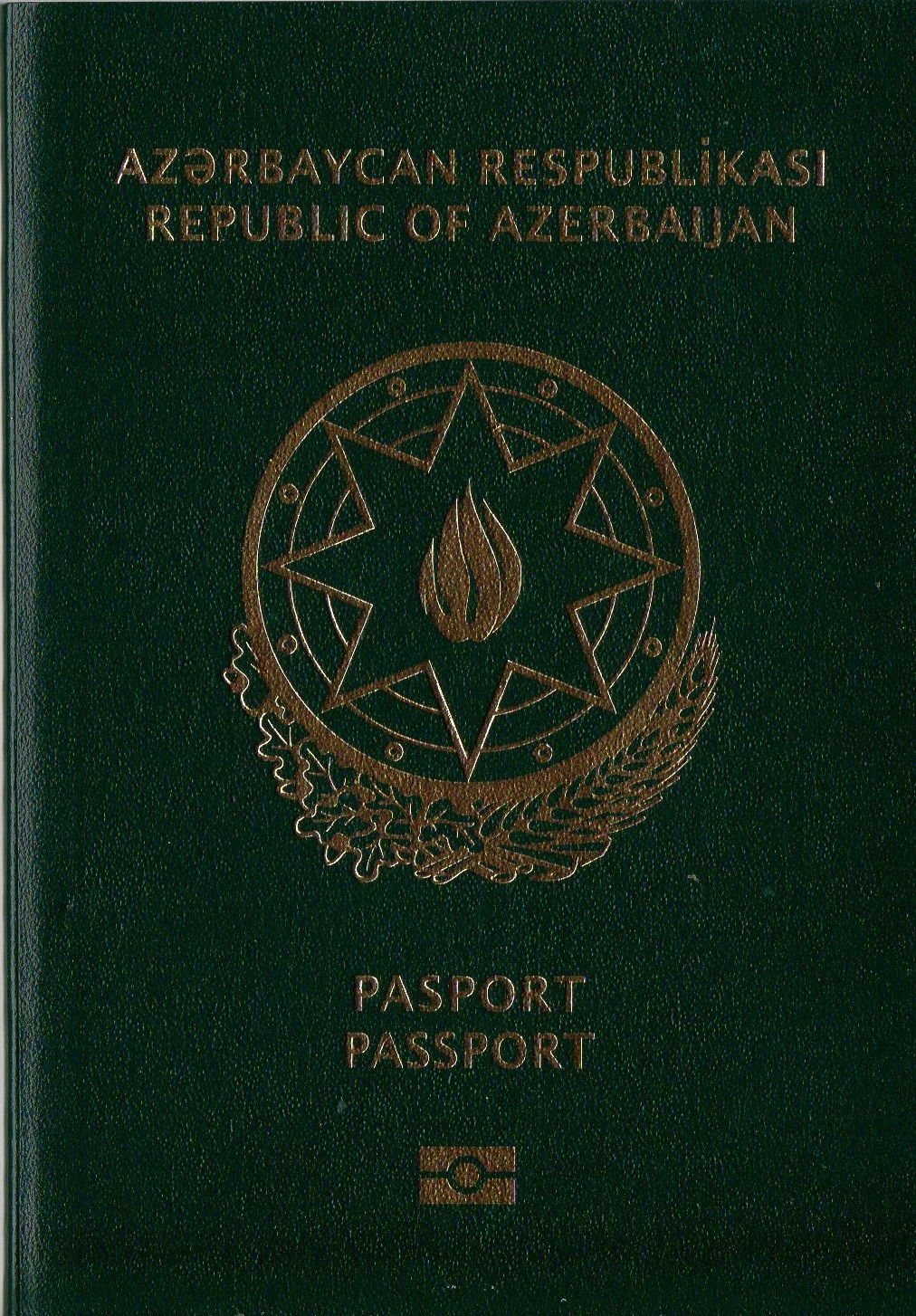
The front cover of a contemporary Azerbaijani biometric passport

Visa requirements for Azerbaijani citizens are administrative entry restrictions by the authorities of other states placed on citizens of Azerbaijan.

As of 2026, Azerbaijani citizens had visa-free or visa on arrival access to 67 countries and territories, ranking the Azerbaijani passport 67th in the world according to the Henley Passport Index.

Azerbaijani citizens in other countries also can benefit from the mobility rights arrangements within the Commonwealth of Independent States.

== Visa requirements map ==
Visa requirements for Azerbaijani citizens holding ordinary passports Azerbaijan Visa not required Visa not required (conditional) Visa on arrival eVisa Visa available both on arrival or online Visa required Special entry permit required

== Visa requirements ==
Country	Visa requirement	Allowed stay	Notes (excluding departure fees)	Reciprocity
Afghanistan	eVisa	30 days	e-Visa : Visitors must arrive at Kabul International (KBL).; Visitors may apply for an e-Visa in other countries, excluding some countries of residence (include Azerbaijan).	✓
Albania	Visa not required	90 days	90 days within any 180-day period.; According to Albanian law must register within 24 hours of your arrival at the local police.	✓
Algeria	Visa required		Persons may be denied entry if entering with a passport containing visas or stamps issued by Israel.; Visitors on tours organized to some southern regions by an approved travel agency may obtain a visa on arrival for up to 30 days.	X
Andorra	Visa required		Although no visa requirements exist, apply the relevant regulations of France or Spain, whichever must be transited to reach Andorra.	✓
Angola	eVisa	30 days	30 days per trip, but no more than 90 days within any 1 calendar year for tourism purposes only.; Visitors must have a return/onward ticket and a hotel reservation confirmation.; An International Certificate of Vaccination is required.	✓
Antigua and Barbuda	Visa not required	180 days		✓
Argentina	Visa required			✓
Armenia	Special permit required		Azerbaijani citizens must have a special entry permit to enter or transit.	–
Australia	Online Visa required		May apply online (Online Visitor e600 visa).	✓
Austria	Visa required			✓
Bahamas	Visa not required	3 months		X
Bahrain	eVisa / Visa on arrival	14 days		✓
Bangladesh	Visa on arrival	30 days		X
Barbados	Visa not required	28 days		X
Belarus	Visa not required	Unlimited		✓
Belgium	Visa required			X
Belize	Visa required			✓
Benin	eVisa	30 days	Must have an international vaccination certificate.; Three types of electronic visa are offered: the e-Visa valid for 30 days for a single entry (50 EUR), the e-Visa valid for 30 days for several (multiple) entries (75 EUR), and the e-Visa valid for 90 days to make several (multiple) entries (100 EUR).	X
Bhutan	eVisa	90 days	The Sustainable Development Fee (SDF) of 200 USD per person, per night for almost all visitors to Bhutan. Additionally, if payment is made in US dollars from September 1, 2023 to August 31, 2027, the SDF is 100 USD.	✓
Bolivia	Online Visa			X
Bosnia and Herzegovina	Visa not required	90 days	90 days within any 180-day period.; According to Bosnia and Herzegovina law must register within 24 hours of your arrival at the local police.	✓
Botswana	eVisa	3 months		✓
Brazil	Visa required			X
Brunei	Visa required			X
Bulgaria	Visa required			X
Burkina Faso	eVisa			✓
Burundi	Online Visa / Visa on arrival	1 month		✓
Cambodia	eVisa / Visa on arrival	30 days		X
Cameroon	eVisa			✓
Canada	Visa required			X
Cape Verde	Visa required			X
Central African Republic	Visa required			✓
Chad	eVisa			✓
Chile	Visa required			x
China	Visa not required	30 days	Citizens of Azerbaijan are allowed to travel without a visa for stays of up to 30 days per visit, and no more than 90 days within a 180-day period, but not permitted visa exemption for Hong Kong and Macao.	✓
Colombia	Visa not required	90 days	Extendable up to 180-days stay within a 1-year period.	X
Comoros	Visa on arrival	45 days		X
Republic of the Congo	Visa required			✓
Democratic Republic of the Congo	eVisa	7 days		✓
Costa Rica	Visa required			X
Côte d'Ivoire	eVisa	3 months	e-Visa holders must arrive via Port Bouet Airport.	X
Croatia	Visa required			X
Cuba	eVisa	90 days	Can be extended up to 90 days with a fee.	X
Cyprus	Visa required			X
Czech Republic	Visa required			X
Denmark	Visa required			X
Djibouti	eVisa	90 days		✓
Dominica	Visa not required	21 days		X
Dominican Republic	Visa required		Visa required, except for passengers with a valid visa issued by Bulgaria, Canada, Croatia, Cyprus, Ireland (Rep.), Romania, United States, United Kingdom or a Schengen Member State.	✓
Ecuador	Visa not required	90 days		X
Egypt	eVisa / Visa on arrival	30 days	Tourists arriving at Sharm El Sheikh, Saint Catherine or Taba airports and remaining in the Sinai resorts do not require a visa up to 14 days.	✓
El Salvador	Visa required			✓
Equatorial Guinea	eVisa			✓
Eritrea	Visa required			✓
Estonia	Visa required			X
Eswatini	Visa required			✓
Ethiopia	eVisa	90 days	e-Visa holders must arrive via Addis Ababa Bole International Airport.	X
Fiji	eVisa			✓
Finland	Visa required			X
France	Visa required			X
Gabon	eVisa	90 days	e-Visa holders must arrive via Libreville International Airport.	X
Gambia	Visa required			✓
Georgia	Visa not required	1 year	If have entered in Abkhazia or South Ossetia the border officers won't let you pass to Georgia.	✓
Germany	Visa required			X
Ghana	Visa required			✓
Greece	Visa required			X
Grenada	Visa required		Holders of a pre-clearance letter may collect visa upon arrival.	✓
Guatemala	Visa required			X
Guinea	eVisa	90 days		X
Guinea-Bissau	Visa on arrival	90 days		X
Guyana	eVisa			✓
Haiti	Visa not required	3 months		X
Honduras	Visa required			X
Hungary	Visa required			X
Iceland	Visa required			X
India	eVisa	30 days	e-Visa holders must arrive via 32 designated airports (Note: Ahmedabad; Amritsar; Bagdogra; Bengaluru; Bhubaneswar; Chandigarh; Chennai; Coimbatore; Delhi; Gaya; Goa-Dabolim; Goa-Manohar; Guwahati; Hyderabad; Indore; Jaipur; Kannur; Kochi; Kolkata; Kozhikode; Lucknow; Madurai; Mangaluru; Mumbai; Nagpur; Port Blair; Pune; Surat; Thiruvananthapuram; Tiruchirappalli; Varanasi; Visakhapatnam) or 5 designated seaports. (Note: Chennai; Cochin; Mormugao (Goa); Mumbai; Mangalore); An Indian e-Tourist Visa may only be obtained twice within 1 calendar year.; Foreigners of Pakistani origin or who hold a Pakistani Passport are not eligible for an e-Visa. Foreigners who are not Pakistani nationals, but whose parents or grandparents (either paternal or maternal) were born in, or were permanent residents in Pakistan, are also not eligible for an e-Visa.	✓
Indonesia	e-VOA / Visa on arrival	30 days		X
Iran	Visa not required	14 days		✓
Iraq	eVisa	30 days		✓
Ireland	Visa required			X
Israel	Visa required			X
Italy	Visa required			X
Jamaica	Visa on arrival			X
Japan	Visa required			X
Jordan	Visa not required	3 months		✓
Kazakhstan	Visa not required	30 days		✓
Kenya	Electronic Travel Authorisation	90 days	Applications can be submitted up to 90 days prior to travel and must be submitted at least 3 days in advance.; eTA fee is 32.50 USD.; Proof of reservation at the hotel where visitors plan to stay is required (if staying with friends, an invitation letter is also acceptable).; Yellow fever vaccination certificate is required if coming from endemic countries.	✓
Kiribati	Visa required			✓
North Korea	Visa required			✓
South Korea	Visa required		Visa-free 30 days for Jeju Island.	X
Kuwait	Visa required			X
Kyrgyzstan	Visa not required			✓
Laos	eVisa / Visa on arrival	30 days	18 (Note: Savannakhet Airport; Lanetoui - Mengkang (China); Meuangmom - Wan Pong (Myanmar); Banvang - Ban Khok Phai (Thailand); Namngeun - Huay Kon (Thailand); Paksan - Bueng Kan (Thailand); Paktaphan - Pak Saeng (Thailand); Pangmon - Ban Huak (Thailand); Phoudou (Thailand); Dak ta ock - Nam Giang (Vietnam); La Lai (Vietnam); Namkan (Vietnam); Namphao - Cau Treo (Vietnam); Namsoy - Na Meo (Vietnam); Naphao - Cha Lo (Vietnam); Pahang - Long Sap (Vietnam); Panghok - Tây Trang (Vietnam); Phoukeua - Bo Y (Vietnam)) of the 33 border crossings are only open to regular visa holders.; e-Visa may be used to enter Laos through the Luang Prabang, Pakse and Vientiane international airports, 3 Thai-Lao Friendship Bridges (Note: Vientiane (Friendship Bridge 1); Savannakhet (Friendship Bridge 2); Bokeo (Friendship Bridge 4)), in Boten (road and railroad), and in Vientiane (at Khamsavath railway station).; Visa on arrival is available at the Luang Prabang, Pakse and Vientiane international airports, 4 Thai-Lao Friendship Bridges (Note: Vientiane (Friendship Bridge 1); Savannakhet (Friendship Bridge 2); Khammouane (Friendship Bridge 3); Bokeo (Friendship Bridge 4)) and 7 border crossings. (Note: Nongnokkheane - Trapeang Kriel (Cambodia); Boten - Bo han (China); Golden Triangle/Samliemkham (Thailand); Khamsavath railway station (Thailand); Namheuang - Ban Na Kraseng (Thailand); Vang tao - Chongmek (Thailand); Dansavan - Lao Bảo (Vietnam))	X
Latvia	Visa required			X
Lebanon	Free visa on arrival	1 month	1 month extendable for 2 additional months.; Granted free of charge at Beirut International Airport or any other port of entry if there is no Israeli visa or seal, holding a telephone number, an address in Lebanon, and a non-refundable return or round trip ticket.	X
Lesotho	Visa required			X
Liberia	e-VOA	3 months		✓
Libya	eVisa			✓
Liechtenstein	Visa required			X
Lithuania	Visa required			X
Luxembourg	Visa required			X
Madagascar	eVisa / Visa on arrival	90 days	For stays of 61 to 90 days, the visa fee is 59 USD.	X
Malawi	eVisa / Visa on arrival	30 days		X
Malaysia	Visa not required	30 days		✓
Maldives	Visa not required	90 days		✓
Mali	Visa required			✓
Malta	Visa required			X
Marshall Islands	Visa on arrival	90 days		X
Mauritania	eVisa	30 days	Available at Nouakchott–Oumtounsy International Airport.	X
Mauritius	Visa on arrival	60 days		X
Mexico	Visa required			X
Micronesia	Visa not required	30 days		X
Moldova	Visa not required	90 days	90 days within any 180-day period.	✓
Monaco	Visa required			X
Mongolia	Visa required			X
Montenegro	Visa required		According to Montenegro law must register within 24 hours of your arrival in Montenegro at the local police.	✓
Morocco	Visa not required	90 days	90 days within any 180-day period.; From 28 August 2024.	✓
Mozambique	eVisa / Visa on arrival	30 days		X
Myanmar	Visa required			✓
Namibia	eVisa / Visa on arrival	3 months / 90 days		X
Nauru	Visa required			✓
Nepal	Online Visa / Visa on arrival	90 days		X
Netherlands	Visa required			X
New Zealand	Visa required		Diplomatic and service passports with the former USSR symbol issued in Azerbaijan are unacceptable, and visas will not be endorsed in them.; Holders of an Australian Permanent Resident Visa or Resident Return Visa may be granted a New Zealand Resident Visa on arrival permitting indefinite stay (pursuant to the Trans-Tasman Travel Arrangement), subject to meeting character requirements and obtaining an Electronic Travel Authority prior to departure.	X
Nicaragua	Visa required			X
Niger	Visa required			✓
Nigeria	eVisa	30 days		✓
North Macedonia	Visa required			X
Norway	Visa required			X
Oman	Visa required		Visa-free for 14 days if residents or have a valid entry visa for one of the following countries (the United States of America, Canada, Australia, the United Kingdom, Schengen Agreement countries, Japan), or to be residents of one of the countries The Gulf Cooperation Council and its profession are among the professions that benefit from the resident visa.	X
Pakistan	eVisa	3 months		✓
Palau	Free visa on arrival	30 days		X
Panama	Visa required			X
Papua New Guinea	eVisa	60 days	Visitors may apply for a visa online under the "Tourist - Own Itinerary" category.	✓
Paraguay	Visa required			X
Peru	Visa required			X
Philippines	Visa required		Residents of the United Arab Emirates may obtain an e-Visa through the official Philippine eVisa website. A valid Emirati residence visa must be shown upon an eVisa application.	✓
Poland	Visa required			X
Portugal	Visa required			X
Qatar	Visa not required	30 days		X
Romania	Visa required			X
Russia	Visa not required	90 days	90 days within one calendar year period.; According to Russian law must register during 7 working days at the place of residence in Department of Citizenship and Migration.; A migration card must be produced along with passport.	✓
Rwanda	eVisa / Visa on arrival	30 days		X
Saint Kitts and Nevis	Visa not required	30 days		✓
Saint Lucia	Visa required			✓
Saint Vincent and the Grenadines	Visa not required	3 months		X
Samoa	Entry permit on arrival	90 days		X
San Marino	Visa required			X
São Tomé and Príncipe	eVisa			X
Saudi Arabia	eVisa / Visa on arrival	90 days		✓
Senegal	Visa required			X
Serbia	Visa not required	90 days	90 days within any 180-day period.; According to Serbia law must register within 24 hours of your arrival at the local police.	X
Seychelles	Electronic Border System	3 months	Application can be submitted up to 30 days before travel.; Visitors must upload a reservation confirmation(s) for each visitor's location of stay in Seychelles.; Yellow fever vaccination certificate is required if coming from endemic countries.; Payment of the fee (EUR 10) by credit or debit card.; Valid for one journey only and it expires once exit the country.	X
Sierra Leone	eVisa	3 months		✓
Singapore	Visa required		May obtain online e-Service through authorized travel agencies or through local sponsors (Singapore citizens or permanent residents).; Visa-free transit for 96 hours.	✓
Slovakia	Visa required			X
Slovenia	Visa required			X
Solomon Islands	Visa required			X
Somalia	eVisa	30 days		X
South Africa	ETA			✓
South Sudan	eVisa		Obtainable online 30 days single entry for 100 USD, 90 days multiple entry for 200 USD and 180 days multiple entry for 350 USD.; Printed visa authorization must be presented at the time of travel.	X
Spain	Visa required			X
Sri Lanka	ETA / Visa on arrival	30 days		✓
Sudan	Visa required			X
Suriname	Visa not required	90 days	An entrance fee of USD 50 or EUR 50 must be paid online prior to arrival.; Multiple entry e-Visa is also available.	X
Sweden	Visa required			X
Switzerland	Visa required			X
Syria	eVisa / Visa on arrival		Visa on arrival for a maximum stay of 15 days.	X
Tajikistan	Visa not required	90 days		✓
Tanzania	eVisa / Visa on arrival	90 days		X
Thailand	eVisa	60 days	Maximum 2 visits annually if not arriving by air.	X
Timor-Leste	Visa on arrival	30 days		X
Togo	eVisa	15 days		X
Tonga	Visa required			✓
Trinidad and Tobago	eVisa	90 days		X
Tunisia	Visa not required (conditional)		Visa not required for tourist groups organised by a travel agency. They must have a return ticket and a confirmed hotel reservation.	✓
Turkey	Visa not required	90 days	ID card valid.	✓
Turkmenistan	Visa required		10-day visa on arrival if holding a letter of invitation provided by a company registered in Turkmenistan with a prior approval from the Foreign Ministry. Visitors can apply to extend their stay for an additional 10 days.; When transiting between two non-bordering countries, visitors can obtain a Turkmenistan transit visa for a five-day stay. This must be applied for in advance at the Turkmenistan Embassy. Visitors must also submit copies of the visas for the country of entry into Turkmenistan and the country of departure from Turkmenistan. Visa fee is 20 USD.	✓
Tuvalu	Visa on arrival	1 month		X
Uganda	eVisa	3 months		X
Ukraine	Visa not required	90 days	90 days within any 180-day period.	✓
United Arab Emirates	Visa not required	90 days	90 days within any 180-day period.	✓
United Kingdom	Visa required			X
United States	Visa required			X
Uruguay	Visa required			✓
Uzbekistan	Visa not required	Unlimited		✓
Vanuatu	Visa not required	120 days		X
Vatican City	Visa required			X
Venezuela	eVisa		Introduction of Electronic Visa System for Tourist and Business Travelers.	✓
Vietnam	eVisa		e-Visa is valid for 90 days and multiple entry.	✓
Yemen	Visa required		Yemen introduced an e-Visa system for visitors who meet certain eligibility requirements (group travel of 10 or more people, business trips, and transit etc.).	✓
Zambia	eVisa	90 days		X
Zimbabwe	eVisa / Visa on arrival	1 month		X

== Dependent, disputed, or restricted territories ==
Unrecognized or partially recognized countries

Territory	Conditions of access	Notes
Abkhazia	Visa required	Tourists from all countries (except Georgia) can visit Abkhazia for a period not exceeding 24 hours as part of an organized tourist group.
Kosovo	Visa not required	90 days
Northern Cyprus	Visa not required	90 days
Palestine	Visa not required	
Somaliland	visa required	
South Ossetia	Visa required	To enter South Ossetia, visitors must have a multiple-entry visa for Russia and register their stay with the Migration Service of the Ministry of Internal Affairs within 3 days.
Taiwan	Visa required	

Dependent and autonomous territories

Territory	Conditions of access	Notes
China
Hong Kong	eVisa	
Macau	Visa on arrival	30 days
Ecuador
Galápagos	Pre-registration required	60 days; Visitors must pre-register to receive a 20 USD Transit Control Card (TCT).

== Visa facilitation ==
Azerbaijan concluded a visa facilitation agreement with the European Union (excluding Denmark and Ireland) which reduces the number of documents sufficient for justifying the purpose of the trip, envisages issuance of multiple-entry visas, limits the length of processing and reduces the issuing fee or waives it entirely for many categories of its citizens.

== Non-visa restrictions ==
=== Blank passport pages ===
Many countries require a minimum number of blank pages to be available in the passport being presented, typically one or two pages. Endorsement pages, which often appear after the visa pages, are not counted as being valid or available.

=== Vaccination ===
Cover of the new International Certificate of Vaccination issued by the Bureau of Quarantine in the Philippines since 2021

The African countries of Angola, Benin, Burkina Faso, Burundi, Cameroon, Central African Republic, Democratic Republic of the Congo, Republic of the Congo, Côte d'Ivoire, Gabon, Ghana, Guinea-Bissau, Mali, Niger, Sierra Leone and Togo, South Sudan and Uganda, along with French Guiana in South America, require all incoming passengers older than nine months to one year, to have a current International Certificate of Vaccination or Prophylaxis.

Some other countries require vaccination only if the passenger is coming from an infected area or has visited one recently or has transited for 12 hours in those countries: Algeria, Botswana, Cabo Verde, Chad, Djibouti, Egypt, Eswatini, Ethiopia, Gambia, Ghana, Guinea, Lesotho, Libya, Equatorial Guinea, Eritrea, Madagascar, Malawi, Mauritania, Mauritius, Mozambique, Namibia, Nigeria, Papua New Guinea, Seychelles, Somalia, South Africa, Sudan, Tunisia, Uganda, Tanzania, Zambia and Zimbabwe.

=== Passport validity length ===
Very few countries, such as Paraguay, just require a valid passport on arrival.

However many countries and groupings now require only an identity card – especially from their neighbours. Other countries may have special bilateral arrangements that depart from the generality of their passport validity length policies to shorten the period of passport validity required for each other's citizens or even accept passports that have already expired (but not been cancelled).

Some countries, such as Japan, Ireland and the United Kingdom, require a passport valid throughout the period of the intended stay.

In the absence of specific bilateral agreements, countries requiring passports to be valid for at least 6 more months on arrival include Afghanistan, Algeria, Anguilla, Bahrain, Bhutan, Botswana, British Virgin Islands, Brunei, Cambodia, Cameroon, Cape Verde, Cayman Islands, Central African Republic, Chad, Comoros, Costa Rica, Côte d'Ivoire, Curaçao, Ecuador, Egypt, El Salvador, Equatorial Guinea, Fiji, Gabon, Guinea Bissau, Guyana, Haiti, India, Indonesia, Iran, Iraq, Israel, Jordan, Kenya, Kiribati, Kuwait, Laos, Madagascar, Malaysia, Marshall Islands, Mongolia, Myanmar, Namibia, Nepal, Nicaragua, Nigeria, Oman, Palau, Papua New Guinea, Peru, Philippines, Qatar, Rwanda, Samoa, Saudi Arabia, Singapore, Solomon Islands, Somalia, Sri Lanka, Sudan, Suriname, Tanzania, Thailand, Timor-Leste, Tokelau, Tonga, Turkey, Tuvalu, Uganda, United Arab Emirates, Vanuatu, Venezuela, and Vietnam.

Countries requiring passports valid for at least 4 months on arrival include Micronesia and Zambia.

Countries requiring passports with a validity of at least 3 months beyond the date of intended departure include Azerbaijan, Bosnia and Herzegovina, Honduras, Montenegro, Nauru, Moldova and New Zealand. Similarly, the EEA countries of Iceland, Liechtenstein, Norway, all European Union countries (except Ireland) together with Switzerland also require 3 months validity beyond the date of the bearer's intended departure unless the bearer is an EEA or Swiss national.

Countries requiring passports valid for at least 3 months on arrival include Albania, North Macedonia, Panama, and Senegal.

Bermuda requires passports to be valid for at least 45 days upon entry.

Countries that require a passport validity of at least one month beyond the date of intended departure include Eritrea, Hong Kong, Lebanon, Macau, the Maldives and South Africa.

==== Maximum passport age ====
Countries of the Schengen area require non-EU passports to be less than 10 years old upon entry.

=== Criminal record ===
Some countries, including Australia, Canada, Fiji, New Zealand and the United States, routinely deny entry to non-citizens who have a criminal record, while others impose restrictions depending on the type of conviction and the length of the sentence.

=== Persona non grata ===
The government of a country can declare a diplomat persona non grata, banning them from entering the country or expelling them if they have already entered. In non-diplomatic use, the authorities of a country may also declare a foreigner persona non grata permanently or temporarily, usually because of unlawful activity.

=== Israeli stamps ===
Kuwait, Lebanon, Libya, and Yemen do not allow entry to people with passport stamps from Israel or whose passports have either a used or an unused Israeli visa, or where there is evidence of previous travel to Israel such as entry or exit stamps from neighbouring border posts in transit countries such as Jordan and Egypt.

To circumvent this Arab League boycott of Israel, the Israeli immigration services have now mostly ceased to stamp foreign nationals' passports on either entry to or exit from Israel (unless the entry is for some work-related purposes). Since 15 January 2013, Israel no longer stamps foreign passports at Ben Gurion Airport. Passports are still (as of 22 June 2017) stamped at Erez when passing into and out of Gaza.

Iran refuses admission to holders of passports containing an Israeli visa or stamp that is less than 12 months old.

=== Biometrics ===
Several countries mandate that all travellers, or all foreign travellers, be fingerprinted on arrival and will refuse admission to or even arrest travellers who refuse to comply. In some countries, such as the United States, this may apply even to transit passengers who merely wish to change planes rather than go landside.

Fingerprinting countries/regions include Afghanistan, Argentina, Brunei, Cambodia, China, Ethiopia, Ghana, Guinea, India, Japan, Kenya (both fingerprints and a photo are taken), Malaysia upon entry and departure, Mongolia, Saudi Arabia, the Schengen Area, Singapore, South Korea, Taiwan, Thailand, Uganda, the United Arab Emirates and the United States.

Many countries also require a photo be taken of people entering the country. The United States, which does not fully implement exit control formalities at its land frontiers (although long mandated by its own legislation), intends to implement facial recognition for passengers departing from international airports to identify people who overstay their visa.

Together with fingerprint and face recognition, iris scanning is one of three biometric identification technologies internationally standardised since 2006 by the International Civil Aviation Organization (ICAO) for use in e-passports and the United Arab Emirates conducts iris scanning on visitors who need to apply for a visa. The United States Department of Homeland Security has announced plans to greatly increase the biometric data it collects at US borders. In 2018, Singapore began trials of iris scanning at three land and maritime immigration checkpoints.

== See also ==
- Visa policy of Azerbaijan
- Azerbaijani passport
