= Kochetkov =

Kochetkov (masculine, Russian: Кочетков) or Kochetkova (feminine, Russian: Кочеткова) is a Russian surname. Notable people with the surname include:

- Aleksandr Kochetkov (1933–2015), Russian soccer player and coach
- Aleksey Kochetkov (born 1971), Russian engineer, publicist, and political scientist
- Denis Kochetkov, Russian professional ice hockey player
- Dina Kochetkova (born 1977), Russian gymnast
- Maria Kochetkova (born 1984), Russian ballet dancer
- Nikolay Kochetkov (1915–2005), Soviet chemist and academician
- Olga Kochetkova (born 1979), Russian swimmer
- Pavel Kochetkov (born 1986), Russian cyclist
- Pyotr Kochetkov (born 1999), Russian ice hockey player
- Sergey Kochetkov (born 1973), Russian fencer
