= Azerbaijan identity card =

Azerbaijani identity card Azerbaijani: Azərbaycan Respublikası vətəndaşının şəxsiyyət vəsiqəsi
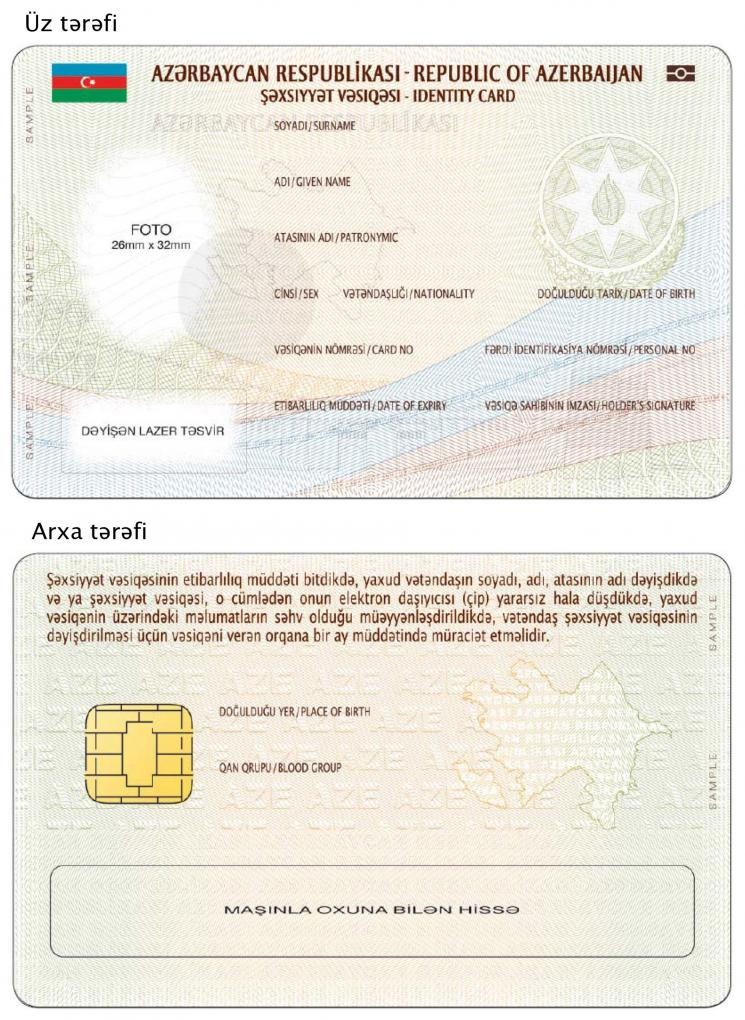
- Type: Identity card, optional replacement for passport in the listed countries
- Issued by: Azerbaijan
- Purpose: Proof of identity and Travel Document
- Valid in: Azerbaijan; Turkey^{1}^1 : If arriving directly from Azerbaijan.
- Eligibility: Azerbaijani citizenship
- Cost: For citizens aged 15 years or older: ₼5 within 10 business days; ₼50 within 3 business days; ₼70 within one business day. For citizens younger than 15 years old: ₼5 within 10 business days; ₼25 within 3 business days; ₼30 within one business day. Re-issuance of lost documents: (applies to all citizens regardless of age) ₼30 within 10 business days; ₼70 within 3 business days; ₼90 within one business day

An Identity card of a citizen of the Republic of Azerbaijan (Azerbaijani: Azərbaycan Respublikası vətəndaşının şəxsiyyət vəsiqəsi)) is an identity document in the territory of the Republic. It is forbidden to obtain it by using illegal way and to refuse to issue or change the identity card. When the identity card is lost, the holder or the legitimate representative of the holder must immediately apply to the state body issuing the document.
Azerbaijan introduced biometric identity cards which the country started to issue by 1 September 2018. Since 1 April 2021, it can be used as a travel document to enter Turkey (only directly from Azerbaijan).

== See also ==
- Azerbaijani nationality law
- Azerbaijani passport
- Driving licence in Azerbaijan
