= Azerbaijani nationality law =

Azerbaijani Citizenship Act

National Assembly
- Citation: The Law of the Azerbaijan Republic On Citizenship of the Azerbaijan Republic
- Territorial extent: Territory of the Republic of Azerbaijan
- Enacted by: Government of Azerbaijan
- Enacted: 12 November 1995
- Effective: 27 November 1995

Amended by
- 30 September 1998 (amending the whole law); 2 July 2014 (latest amendment)
- Status: Amended

According to the Article 3. "Equal Citizenship" of the Law of Azerbaijan on citizenship of the Republic of Azerbaijan, The citizenship of the Republic of Azerbaijan shall be equal to everyone regardless of basis for acquiring such citizenship. Azerbaijani passport is issued to its citizens by the Ministry of Internal Affairs.

Azerbaijani nationality law (Azerbaijani: Azərbaycan vətəndaşlığı hüququ) is regulated by the Constitution of Azerbaijan, as amended; the Citizenship Law of Azerbaijan and its revisions; and various international agreements to which the country is a signatory. These laws determine who is, or is eligible to be, an Azerbaijani national.

The legal means to acquire nationality, formal legal membership in a nation, differ from the domestic relationship of rights and obligations between a national and the nation, known as citizenship. Nationality describes the relationship of an individual to the state under international law, whereas citizenship is the domestic relationship of an individual within the nation. Some countries use the terms nationality and citizenship as synonyms, despite their legal distinction and the fact that they are regulated by different governmental administrative bodies. Colloquially, as in most former Soviet states, citizenship is often used as a synonym for nationality, because nationality is associated with ethnicity.

Azerbaijani nationality is typically obtained under the principle of jus sanguinis, i.e. by birth to parents with Azerbaijani nationality. It can be granted to persons with an affiliation to the country, or to a permanent resident who has lived in the country for a given period of time through naturalization.

== Acquiring Azerbaijani nationality ==
Nationality in Azerbaijan is typically acquired by birth to an Azerbaijani or later in life through naturalization. Unlike some developing countries, there is no program or accelerated route to citizenship of Azerbaijan via investment.

=== By birth ===
Until the 2014 amendment changed nationality requirements, jus soli, birth in Azerbaijan was the primary basis for acquiring nationality. A reversal of that policy was prompted by fears of the actions of neighboring post-Soviet spaces and challenges to Azerbaijani sovereignty. If both parents of a child born in Azerbaijan are foreigners or if one parent is a foreigner and the other is stateless or unknown, the child is not considered to be Azerbaijani. Those who can acquire nationality by birth include:

- Children born anywhere to at least one parent who is an Azerbaijani national; or
- Children born in Azerbaijan, if both parents are stateless.

=== By naturalization ===
Foreigners can apply for naturalization in Azerbaijan provided that they have continuously resided in the country, being absent no more than three months, for at least five years from the issuance of a permanent residency permit or confirmation of refugee status. General provisions are that applicants have a legal income, have sufficiency in the Azerbaijani language, and respect the laws of the country. Applications for naturalization must be submitted to the State Migration Service (Azerbaijani: Dövlәt Miqrasiya Xidmәti) in Baku. Documentation must be presented to confirm that the applicant meets the residency requirements, has paid any taxes due to the state, has a certificate from the Ministry of Education verifying language proficiency, and documents which confirm the current nationality. Minor children follow the nationality of their parents, thus if a parent naturalizes and the child is under fourteen years old, the child automatically becomes Azerbaijani as long as both parents agree, or in the case that one parent is stateless. Naturalization is not allowed if the person has participated in activities that could damage the state, its territory or security, or the health, morality, or public order of the country; if they have been accused of attempting to overthrow or change the systems of the state or social order; or if they have participated in terrorism or activities that would foment hostility on the basis of race, religion, or ethnic superiority. The president of Azerbaijan is the final authority on who is admitted as a national of the country. Those who are admitted as nationals must swear that they have no civic obligations outstanding to other states and take an oath of allegiance. Other persons who can acquire nationality by naturalization include:

- Foundlings or orphans whose parents are unknown, after an administrative process;
- Adoptees of Azerbaijani nationals upon completion of a legal adoption if requested;
- Children between the ages of fourteen and eighteen who consent to be naturalized at the time that their parents are naturalized;
- Children who did not gain Azerbaijani nationality when their parent(s) nationality changed, through an administrative procedure;
- Persons who are current residents of Azerbaijan and who were nationals of Azerbaijan or the Azerbaijan SSR or who were born in the country prior to the 1998 Citizenship Act coming into force, but who did not gain nationality under the Act and have remained in the country;
- Refugees or forced migrants who entered the country between 1988 and 1992, through an administrative procedure;
- Persons with exceptional skill in the arts or culture, science, sport, or technology, whose contributions may be beneficial to the country may naturalize without meeting naturalization requirements; or
- Persons who the state deems to be of special interest or those who have rendered significant service to the nation may naturalize without meeting other requirements.

== Loss of nationality ==
Azerbaijani are allowed to renounce their nationality, provided that comply with registration processes. The government may oppose if the applicant has outstanding civic obligations to the state, persons, or legal entities, or is involved in a criminal proceeding. Nationals can be denaturalized for obtaining other nationality; for serving in the government administration or armed services of a foreign country; for committing crimes against the state or state security; for actions related to religious extremism or terrorism including recruitment; or for fraud, misrepresentation, or concealment in acquiring nationality. Loss of nationality involves a legal proceeding in Azerbaijan, rather than being a process of the operation of law. Persons who have previously lost their Azerbaijani nationality may repatriate as long as they meet the requirements to naturalize.

== Dual nationality ==
Azerbaijan does not recognize dual nationality and it used to constitute grounds for criminal prosecution. Persons who acquire another nationality are required to notify the authorities within thirty days or risk denaturalization and/or payment of fines under the Criminal Code. However, the criminal liability was abolished in 2020.

== Visa requirements ==
Visa requirements for Azerbaijani citizens

In 2017, Azerbaijani citizens had visa-free or visa on arrival access to 62 countries and territories, ranking the Azerbaijani passport 74th in the world according to the Visa Restrictions Index.

== History ==
Humans have been present in the territory now known as Azerbaijan since Paleolithic times. From the ninth century BC semi-nomadic Scythian peoples began settling in the region and within a century, the Medes, an ancient Persian people, had conquered the southern part of what is Azerbaijan. For much of the history of the territory, was ruled by successive Persian Empires. The Median Empire was defeated in the region by Cyrus the Great in the sixth century BC and then in the fourth century BC by Alexander the Great, who called the area Caucasian Albania (or Albanoi) (Note: Caucasian Albania has no relationship to the European nation located on the Balkan peninsula known as Albania. It was located in Western Asia in the eastern part of the Transcaucasus between the Caucasus Mountains and the Kura River.) and retained the Persian satraps as governors. In ancient Persia the king had absolute authority as the administrator of his subjects and armies, the giver of law, and the supreme judge of the empire. The centralized government of the empire was divided into satrapies, or provinces, for ease of management and taxation. Local satraps had no control over the military forces in their region to prevent them diluting the power of the ruler, but they managed the civilian administration over the areas for which they governed. Ethnic groups had legal autonomy to regulate their own internal conflicts. Rulers were responsible for security in the realm and management of the economy. In exchange for protection, Persian subjects paid taxes and owed loyalty to the king and his leadership. Marriage in the period was cum manu meaning the wife was legally incapacitated and under the control of her husband.

When Alexander's Macedonian Empire collapsed, Caucasian Albania became a vassal state of the Seleucid Empire in the second century BC. Between the fourth and third centuries BC the union of tribes throughout the Caucasus formed the Kingdom of Albania. Roman annexation of Albania occurred between the first and third centuries AD, but as Rome declined, Persia re-established vassalage over the kingdom, first through the Parthian Empire and then its successor, the Sasanian Empire. By the fourth century, the Sasanians and Byzantine Empire, successor state to Rome, were in conflict which caused a gradual decline and the eventual collapse of the Sassanid empire in the last half of the seventh century. At that time, Arabs brought Islam to the area and annexed Arran, as they called the former territory of Caucasian Albania, to the Abbasid Caliphate. Arabic rule continued through the eleventh century. In the Islamic state, subjects were defined by religious allegiance and loyalty to a ruler was as a result of his membership in the confessional community and his religious position, meaning that religious and political principles and offices were inseparable. Leaders served as religious and administrative authorities, teaching doctrine and acting to settle disputes, maintain order, and provide economic benefits to their communities. In exchange, subjects were committed to the leader and the defense of Islam. Women were required to have a guardian, either their father, a relative, or the sultan, who gave her in marriage. After marriage, she was required to be obedient to her husband's authority over her.

From the ninth century, the Shirvanshah Kingdom became dominant in the northeastern region of the territory lasting through the sixteenth century. The Kingdom was strongly influenced by the Turko-Persian Seljuk Empire, which had invaded in the eleventh century from Central Asia and ended the dominance of Arab rule. The Mongol Empire invaded in the thirteenth century, subjugating the Shirvanshah Kingdom to the Il Khanate, when the Mongols divided their empire in 1256. The Il Khanate returned the region to Islamic practices but with predominant Persian cultural influences, which were retained by the Turko-Mongol Timurid Empire which was dominant between 1370 and 1405. Upon the collapse of the Timurids, two successive Turkic tribes ruled the area until it was returned to Persian dominance under the Safavid Empire in 1501. The Safavids were the predominant power in the area until 1722.

=== Persian, Ottoman, and Russian conflicts (18th–19th centuries) ===
From the beginning of the eighteenth century, conflict emerged between the Safavids and Ottoman Empire for control of the territory. These struggles weakened the Safavid Empire, which then came under attack by the Russian Empire. In 1722, Peter the Great led a campaign that established Russian dominance in the Northern Caucasus, including the northern part of Arran. Though the Persians retained control over the southern regions of Arran successive wars resulted in continuous loss of territory to the Russians and by 1828 all remaining Persian possessions in the Caucasus had been ceded to Russia. In Russia, persons residing in the territory of the empire were known as "poddanstvo" (subjects) and were under obligation of absolute subjection to the Tsar until 1917. Subjects were neither allowed to emigrate nor naturalize in a foreign state. The policy emphasized the collective nature of the community, which was jointly responsible to pay tax, provide labor, and share in the harvest to the landlord and state. Foreigners could not enter the country without the approval of the Tsar and were restricted to reside in specific areas and wear identifying clothing.

Groups which were prohibited from becoming Russian subjects included Dervishes, Jesuits, Jews, and married women, unless their spouse was Russian. Treaties and trade agreements defined the extraterritorial jurisdiction of foreigners residing in the nation and gave foreigners special privileges, like exemptions from paying taxes, the right to practice their religion, and freedom of movement. From 1721, the only requirement for naturalization of foreigners in the Russian Empire changed from conversion to Russian Orthodoxy to swearing an oath of allegiance to the Tsar. The following year a decree was issued which confirmed that sons born in Russia to foreigners in service to the Tsar were automatically subjects of Russia. Russian policy on territorial annexation up to 1860 was that all persons living in such a territory automatically were conferred Russian nationality, but the rights of citizenship of these groups varied based upon ethnicity, religion, and social status.

From 1864, naturalization required a five-year residency. Persons who were in service of the nation, who invested funds that benefited Russia, or who had unique ability or scientific knowledge could acquire nationality with a reduced residency period. Children born to foreigners in Russian territory could choose to acquire Russian nationality within one year of reaching majority, if they had been educated and grew up in Russia. Russian women who married foreigners were no longer Russian subjects and foreign women who married Russians automatically became Russian upon solemnization of a religious marriage. In 1879, Article 7 of the Treaty of Constantinople which was signed at the end of the Russo-Turkish War, set a precedent for annexation thereafter, establishing that residents could choose which nationality they wished to have after annexation terms were agreed upon. (Note: Eric Lohr, chair of the History Department at American University and a specialist on Russian history gives the term of six months for the Treaty of Constantinople. The treaty states, "Les habitants des localités cédées à la Russie qui voudraient fixer leur résidence hors de ces territoires seront libres de se retirer, en vendant leurs propriétés immobilières. Un délai de trois ans leur sera accordé à cet effet à partir de la ratification du présent acte. Passé ce délai, les habitants qui n'auraient pas quitté le pays et vendu leurs immeubles resteront sujets Russes". ["The inhabitants of the localities ceded to Russia who would like to establish their residence outside these territories will be free to withdraw, by selling their immovable properties. A period of three years will be granted to them for this purpose from the ratification of this act. After this period, the inhabitants who have not left the country and sold their buildings will remain Russian subjects".]) Persons who failed to express a desire within the allotted time frame to retain their existing nationality would automatically become Russian. An update to the nationality statutes in 1899 provided that children born anywhere to Russian parents automatically became Russian.

=== War and independence (1905–1920) ===
While the 1905 Russian Revolution did not spark an independence movement among the peoples in Arran, it did mark the start of the rise of political activity and ethnic identification. Upon the collapse of the Russian Empire in 1917, however, the provincial council declared the independence of the Azerbaijan Democratic Republic in 1918. The Republic was backed by the Ottoman Empire and Ottoman troops remained in the territory until World War I ended, when they were replaced in late 1918 by British forces. In August 1918, the Azerbaijans passed the Act on Subjecthood, which defined subjects as those who were maternally descended from an Azerbaijani. One year later, the country passed a Law on Citizenship, which bestowed blanket nationality upon any former Russian subject who had been born in Azerbaijan. The statute did not permit dual nationality.

=== Soviet Azerbaijan (1920–1991) ===
In April 1920, the Red Army backed by supporters in the Azerbaijani Communist Party invaded the country. Though the government attempted to form a union with Persia, it was unable to come to terms and in September signed a treaty with Russia granting Russia control over its economy, foreign affairs, and military. In 1922, the Azerbaijan Soviet Socialist Republic was joined with the Armenian Soviet Socialist Republic and Georgian Soviet Socialist Republic to form the Transcaucasian Socialist Federative Soviet Republic, which lasted until 1936 and was then separated into its constituent states. In 1924, the Soviet Union created a unitary nationality for all inhabitants of the various socialist republics. It presumed that anyone residing within the territory prior to enactment of the statute was automatically a Soviet national, unless they were able to prove otherwise. Under its terms, a child born to at least one parent who was a national of one of the Soviet republics was automatically a national of that republic, as well as the federation. If the parents were residing abroad at the birth of the child, the parents could choose to have Soviet nationality or other nationality. Neither marriage nor naturalization of one party automatically impacted a spouse or children; however, if both parents changed their nationality or renounced Soviet nationality children under the age of fourteen followed the parental nationality.

Each Soviet republic was allowed to determine who was eligible for naturalization in their territory. Naturalization gave them Soviet nationality, but did not automatically grant the rights of citizenship other republics. Renunciation of nationality was allowed upon obtaining permission from the Central Executive Committee of the Soviet Union. Nationals could be denaturalized for obtaining dual nationality, leaving federation territory without permission, or by a court order as a punishment for crime. An amendment (Law 581) in 1925 provided that persons who had been granted amnesty for service in the White Army and prisoners of war who had served in the Tsarist or Red Army who were abroad and failed to register with the Soviet Federation were deprived of their nationality, but could apply to be reinstated through naturalization. The mass denaturalizations of Russian people living abroad resulted in approximately 1.5 million stateless persons who were unable to acquire nationality in their places of residence under restrictive policies implemented globally in the interwar years.

In 1930, a resolution was passed specifying that all people within Soviet territory who did not prove that they were nationals of a foreign state were to be recognized as Soviet. In 1938 a new Soviet Nationality Law was passed to conform with the provisions of the 1936 Constitution of the Soviet Union. Under its terms, the soviet republics no longer defined nationality within their borders. Instead, nationality was acquired under the specifications of the Soviet law. Soviet passports indicated with which republic a national was affiliated and change of permanent residence automatically changed the state affiliation. The 1938 nationality law did not specify that nationality was acquired at birth through a Soviet parent and made no provisions for foundlings, leaving the possibility open that a child could be born stateless. (Note: George Ginsburgs, a professor of comparative and foreign law at Rutgers University, noted that despite the presumption of jus sanguinis, failure to specify that the principle applied made the nationality law subject to interpretation and in conflict with other legislation, such as the Family Code.) It affirmed that those who had previously acquired Soviet nationality by being subjects of the Russian Empire and those who acquired it under prior laws remained nationals unless they had previously been denaturalized. It specified that persons who were permanent residents in Soviet territory but were foreigners without proof of other nationality were considered to be stateless, a reversal of the previous policy that they were automatically assumed to be Soviet. As a consequence, their children would also be stateless, unless they were allowed to naturalize upon reaching majority. In 1939, a resolution was passed which confirmed that laws which had previously been enacted but which countered the 1938 provision for statelessness were no longer valid.

A 1944 change to the Family Code repealed the right of a woman to sue for the father's identity and nationality to be bestowed upon a child born out of wedlock. The 1944 decree effected all applicable codes, making acquisition of nationality for an illegitimate child derivative of its mother. The result of the statute was that if the mother was stateless or foreign, the child, even if its father was known was unable to be a Soviet national. A decree in 1945 modified the provision slightly, determining that if the parents married the child could be recognized by its father on an equal footing as children born within the marriage. The age of the child was immaterial and their nationality became automatic, as if from birth. In 1977, the Soviet Union adopted a new constitution, which contained nationality provisions in Chapter 6, reaffirming that persons of any of the constituent states of the Union were Soviet nationals. A new nationality statute was created in 1978, which incorporated all previous legislation for acquiring nationality. It expressly prohibited both dual nationality and extradition of a Soviet national to a foreign state. The final Soviet nationality statute was adopted in 1990 and went into effect on 1 January 1991. Under its terms, children acquired nationality by being born to parents who were Soviet nationals. It was primarily notable for codifying, rather than leaving the grounds for denaturalization up to the discretion of the Presidium of the Supreme Soviet. These included service to a foreign state or military, failure to register with a consulate while residing abroad, and falsifying information to obtain nationality. The law also changed the final authority on nationality decisions, moving the power to approve or deny from the Presidium to the president.

On 23 September 1989, the Azerbaijan Soviet Socialist Republic declared its sovereignty, meaning that Soviet legislation was subordinated to that of Azerbaijan. Subsequently, on 26 June 1990, the Azerbaijan SSR issued a Citizenship Act acknowledging that those who previously were Azerbaijani remained Azerbaijani. Children born anywhere to Azerbaijani nationals acquired nationality at birth. Children born in the territory or born abroad to at least one parent who was a permanent resident of Azerbaijan also automatically became nationals, as did children born in Azerbaijan whose parents were stateless or unknown. The law contained no requirements for naturalization other than the filing of an application and taking of an oath of allegiance, but specified that applications could be rejected by the President of Azerbaijan for various actions that might harm the country. Nationals could renounce their nationality, if the state agreed that it would not be against the interests of the country and could repatriate upon application. Denaturalization was based upon a decision by authorities that a national was serving in the military or government administration of a foreign nation, was permanently residing abroad for more than five years, had acted in a manner to damage state interest or security, or had acquired nationality through fraud.

On 2 September 1991, the Nagorno-Karabakh Autonomous Oblast declared its independence from the Soviet Union, though legally it was part of Azerbaijan which was followed 18 October by an independence declaration for Azerbaijan. (Note: Beginning in 1988, Armenia and Azerbaijan were at war over what would become of the Nagorno-Karabakh Autonomous Oblast. Perestroika and glasnost policies of Russian president Mikhail Gorbachev promised restructuring of economic and political systems and ignited concerns over what would befall the territory. A joint decision was made on 1 December 1989 by the Supreme Soviet of the Armenian Soviet Socialist Republic and Nagorno-Karabakh's Artsakh National Council calling for the reunification of the Armenian SSR and the Mountainous Region of Karabakh. The conflict did not end until 1994, when the Bishkek Protocol was signed to bring peace by representatives of Armenia, Azerbaijan, and the Nagorno-Karabakh Republic, an internationally unrecognized state.) Under the terms of the proposed constitution, adopted with the independence declaration and awaiting approval through a plebiscite, as of 1 January 1992, anyone who was a registered resident in Azerbaijan on that date was automatically conferred nationality. Persons who were of Azerbaijani descent, who were not residing in the country on the effective date were not granted nationality. Afterward, anyone born in the territory of Azerbaijan or to at least one Azerbaijani parent acquired Azerbaijani nationality, but dual nationality was barred. On 10 December a referendum confirmed that 99.89 percent of the voters in Nagorno-Karabakh favored independence. The Soviet Union officially ended on 26 December and the fifteen former Soviet republics became independent nations. Azerbaijan's referendum on independence was held three days later on 29 December, and approved by 95 percent of the voters.

=== Post-independence (1991–present) ===
In 1995, the new constitution was adopted. Nationality continued to be defined by birth in the territory or to an Azerbaijani, but removed the possibility that Azerbaijani could be deprived of their nationality. (Note: On 18 November 1995, the Nagorno-Karabakh Republic passed legislation defining its citizens. Though the state issues passports, it is not internationally recognized and many of its citizens travel on Armenian or Russian passports.) Specifically, Article 52 of the constitution stated that persons born in Azerbaijani territory acquired nationality. A new nationality act was passed in 1998, which provided that those who derived nationality based on residency in 1992 must have maintained a residency in Azerbaijan through the effective date of the 1998 statute. In other words, if they had left the country, arrived after 1 January 1992, or failed to maintain their residency registration, Azerbaijani nationals could lose their nationality, if they did not apply for nationality within one year of the effective date, 30 September 1999, of the law. Article 5 provided specifically that refugees who had arrived in the territory between 1 January 1988 to 1 January 1992 became automatic nationals. However, there were no provisions for persons living in the break-away state of the Nagorno-Karabakh Republic to acquire Azerbaijani nationality. Equal weight was given to jus soli and jus sanguinis as a means to acquire nationality. Meaning children born anywhere to nationals of Azerbaijan (Article 11) and children born in Azerbaijan to stateless (Article 12) or unknown (Article 13) parents, acquired nationality at birth. Naturalization required a five year residency and fluency in the Azerbaijani language, but prohibited anyone from obtaining nationality if they would pose a threat to the health of the country, public order, or state security. Marriage had no effect on nationality, nor did dual nationality.

In 2008, an amendment to the naturalization procedure clarified that the five-year residency period had to be continuous from the date of issuance of the residency permit and that residency had to be both legal and permanent; that applicants had to have a legal income; and that they must comply with the legislation of the country. Those provisions could be waived for persons who had skills that could contribute to the nation, such as those who had exceptional ability in cultural performance, science, sport, or technology. On 30 May 2014, a major shift to descent in acquiring nationality from birth was introduced by an amendment to the nationality laws. Invasions of neighboring post-Soviet spaces and fear of challenges to Azerbaijani sovereignty, led to more restrictive provisions. Birth in the territory under the new law barred children from acquiring nationality if the parents were foreigners, or if one parent was a foreigner and the other was stateless. The change eliminated providing a birth certificate as adequate grounds for acquiring nationality. In addition, the amendment introduced conditions under which nationality could be lost for acquiring dual nationality without informing the state, for serving in a government or military of a foreign country, for committing actions which were construed to be harmful to the Azerbaijani state, or for acquiring nationality through fraud. These changes conflicted with the provisions of the constitution which granted unconditional jus soli and the inability of the state to deprive Azerbaijani of their nationality.

A procedural amendment of 2 July 2014, provided that conflicts in national legislation were to be resolved according to international legal standards and that the Azerbaijan Service and Assessment Network was tasked with providing the necessary certification for verifying parental affiliation to establish the nationality of a child born to Azerbaijani parents. Further changes to the nationality law were made on 30 December 2014, and included that persons fourteen and older who repatriated were required to take an oath of allegiance, as was anyone who naturalized. On 18 March 2015, the Cabinet of Azerbaijan, passed the "Rules for Establishment of the Citizenship of the Republic of Azerbaijan", to make provisions for the recognition of persons as Azerbaijani. It established an administrative procedure for certain persons to acquire nationality even if they lacked the necessary documents. It applied to persons who were nationals of Azerbaijan or the Azerbaijan SSR or who were born in the country prior to the 1998 Citizenship Act coming into force, but who did not gain nationality under the Act and had not left the country; children born in the country whose parent(s) had renounced Azerbaijani nationality before the child's majority; children who had not acquired Azerbaijani nationality when their parents naturalized; foreign or stateless children adopted by an Azerbaijani national; children born in the territory to unknown parents; or persons who were refugees (or forced migrants) and entered the country between 1988 and 1992. The Citizenship Act was amended again on 30 September 2015, which specified that nationality could be restored by the president under the provisions of the constitution and could be lost by a determination of the court. Other changes were made on 4 December 2015, providing that nationality could be lost for actions of religious extremism or terrorism.

In 2016, the constitution was amended after a plebiscite to remove Article 53 which did not allow the state to deprive Azerbaijani of their affiliation to the state, but it did not amend Article 52, the right to unconditional jus soli. On 24 June 2016 the nationality statute was amended to include confirmation of refugee status as a valid means for establishing when residency began. On 31 May 2017 a procedural amendment required that nationality documents conform to the stipulations of the Act on Document Duty. On 1 February 2018 an amendment to the Citizenship Act was introduced in an attempt to rectify the issue of persons who arrived in Azerbaijan after 1 January 1992 from other former Soviet republics and who had Soviet passports at that time. When these documents ceased to be recognized in 2005, those residents of Azerbaijan had no identification documents but were not officially recognized as stateless. The amendment of Article 14 allowed a court to evaluate the circumstances and establish statelessness to allow acquisition of nationality through naturalization. A change to the nationality statute, made on 1 October 2018, rearranged the provisions in Article 15, for persons who wished to restore their nationality. An amendment, made on 1 February 2019, required a national identity document to substantiate the nationality of minors under age fifteen or a certification from the Azerbaijan Service and Assessment Network and another on 1 May 2020, added a 30-day provision for notification of the authorities upon acquiring dual nationality to prevent loss of nationality.

== See also ==
- Azerbaijani passport
- Migration policy of Azerbaijan
- Visa policy of Azerbaijan
