= Monika Hausammann =

Swiss writer

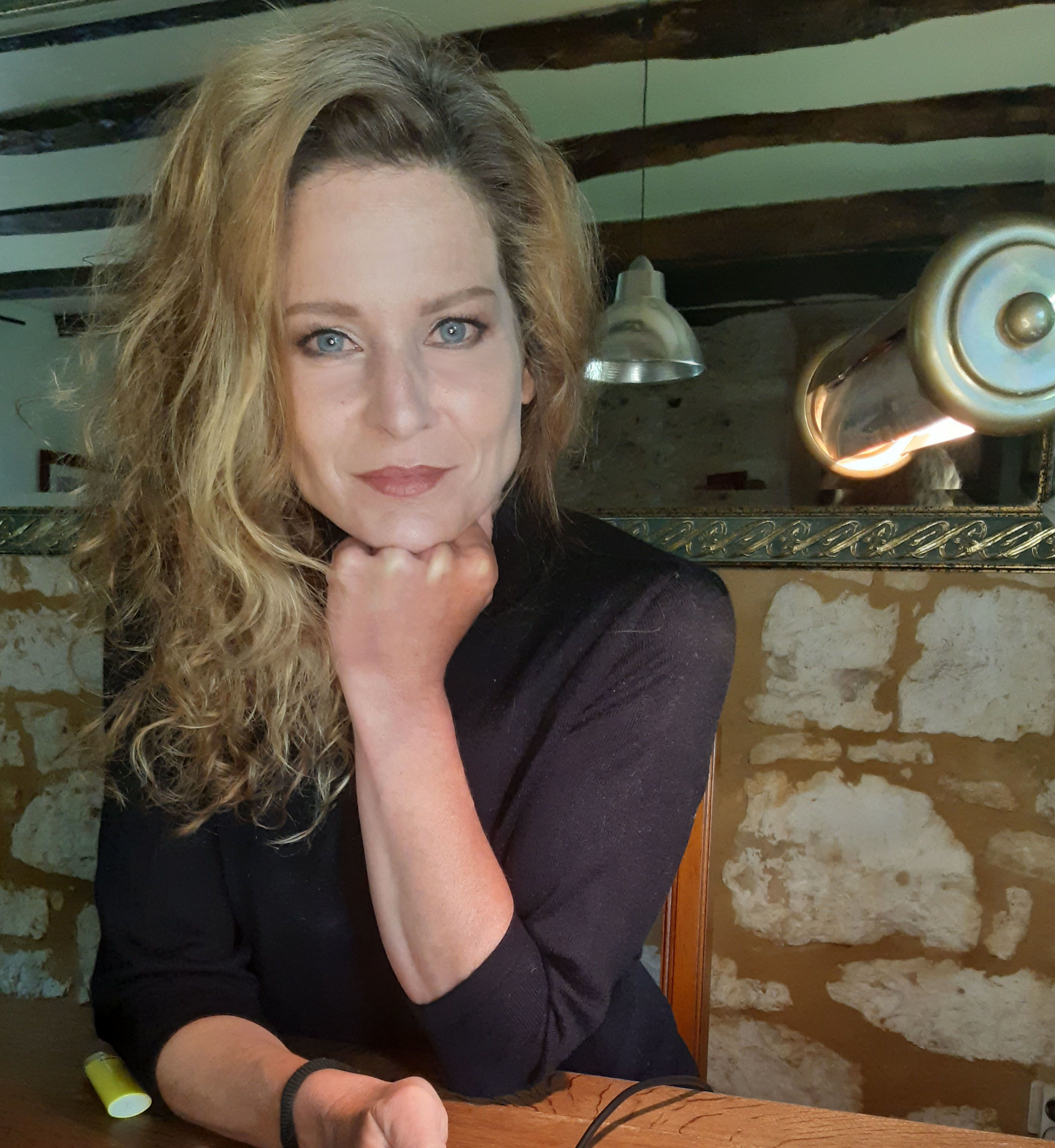
- Born: 1974 (age 50–51); Bern, Switzerland
- Occupation(s): Writer, columnist
- Website: hausammann.fr

Monika Hausammann (born 1974) is a Swiss author.

== Biography ==
Hausammann grew up in canton Bern in Switzerland and attended grammar school. Her father, Peter Hausammann, was the CEO of Espace Media Groupe. At the age of 17, she went to Paris and lived there on her own for a year. Afterwards, she financed herself a classic vocational training and then a degree in business administration at a French private university. Ten years in the private sector followed.

In 2016, Hausammann released her first book, the political thriller Die Ministerin. Kein Fall für Carl Brun ("The Minister. No Case for Carl Brun"). This was followed by Der Fonds. Kein Fall für Carl Brun in 2017 and Das Attentat. Kein Fall für Carl Brun in 2019. Her latest thriller was released in October 2020: Ares. Kein Fall für Carl Brun, a political thriller about the Swiss secret service. The book was discussed and praised in several newspapers, including the Weltwoche and the Berner Zeitung. The German Top Magazine included it in its six reading tips for the summer.

Hausammann lives in seclusion on a country estate on the French Atlantic coast and, in addition to her novels, writes a monthly column for the liberal magazine Schweizer Monat. In July/August, she was featured on the cover of the magazin. In June 2021, Hausammann joined the Swiss Reihnhardt Verlag Group in Basel.

== Publications ==
- Die Ministerin. Kein Fall für Carl Brun, Lichtschlag, Grevenbroich 2016, ISBN 978-3-939562-43-6
- Der Fonds. Kein Fall für Carl Brun, Lichtschlag, Grevenbroich 2017, ISBN 978-3-939562-77-1
- Das Attentat. Kein Fall für Carl Brun, Lichtschlag, Grevenbroich 2019, ISBN 978-3-939562-88-7
- Ares. Kein Fall für Carl Brun, Fontis, Basel 2022, ISBN 978-3-03848-243-7
- Die Große Verkehrung. Dem Humanismus mit biblischem Denken begegnen. Eine Ansage, Fontis, Basel 2022, ISBN 978-3-03848-233-8
