= Vehicle registration plates of Azerbaijan =

Azerbaijan number plate
- Sample of the contemporary Azerbaijan license plate (Baku)
- Country: Azerbaijan
- Country code: AZ

Current series
- Size: 520mm x 110mm
- Material: Aluminum
- Serial format: 88-BE-114
- Colour (front): Black on white
- Colour (rear): Black on white
- Introduced: 2011

A plate of the type issued before 2011

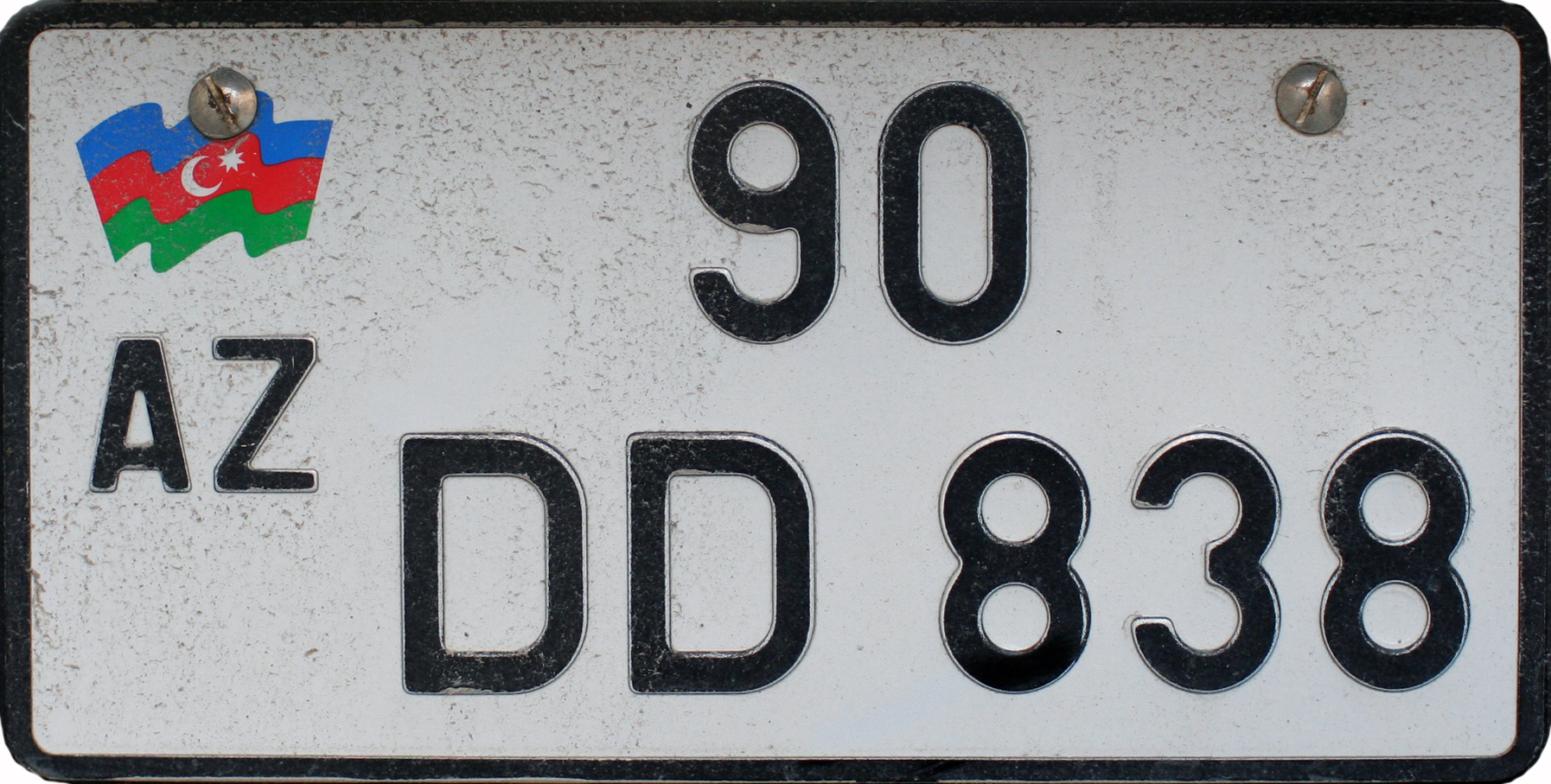
Rectangular format (rear) plate. Unlike the rear, the DIN-shaped front plate on this car has dashes.

Vehicle registration plates of Azerbaijan are usually composed of two numbers (identifying the vehicle registration department), a hyphen, two letters, a hyphen, and three numbers (e.g., 88-BE-114). The plates feature black font on a white background. They are the same size as European license plates and feature the Azerbaijani flag and the country code AZ on the left side.

The color of the plate varies depending on vehicle usage and ownership type. On standard formats, the flag and "AZ" designation appear on the left, while square-format plates position the flag and country code in the top-left corner.

== Previous series ==
Between 1977 and 1993, Azerbaijan registration plates were manufactured in accordance with the Soviet GOST 3207-77 standard. The alphanumeric sequence took the form of: x #### XX, where x is a lowercase Cyrillic serial/counter letter; # is any digit in the range 0–9; and XX are two uppercase Cyrillic letters indicating where the vehicle was first registered.

Azerbaijan used codes АГ, АЖ and АЗ without particularity of city or department.

== Car designations ==
As with Turkish plates (which in turn adopted a reversed version of the former French license plate system), in Azerbaijani plates the first two digits of the license plate represent the department, followed by a progressive 2-letter and 3-number system (progression starting with 90-AA-001 and ending with 90-ZZ-999). Below is a table of digits and relevant departments, bold means this department is a part of Naxçıvan AR):

Code	Department	Code	Department	Code	Department
01	Absheron	27	Khankendi	52	Salyan
02	Agdam	28	Khojavend	53	Siazan
03	Agdash	29	Khizi	54	Sabirabad
04	Aghjabadi	30	Imishli	55	Shaki
05	Agstafa	31	Ismayilli	56	Shamakhi
06	Agsu	32	Kalbajar	57	Shamkir
07	Astara	33	Kurdamir	58	Shusha
08	Balakan	34	Qax	59	Tartar
09/13	Barda	35	Qazakh	60	Tovuz
10/77/88/90	Baku	36	Qabala	61	Shahbuz
11	Beylagan	37	Gobustan	62	Zaqatala
12	Bilasuvar	38	Qusar	63	Zardab
14	Jabrayil	39	Qubadli	64	Zangilan
15	Jalilabad	40	Quba	65	Sharur
16	Julfa	41	Lachin	66	Shirvan
17	Dashkasan	42	Lankaran	67	**Babek**
18	Askeran	43	Lerik	68	Tartar
19	Fuzuli	44	Masally	69	**Ordubad**
20	Ganja	45	Mingachevir	70	Ujar
21	Gadabay	46	Naftalan	71	Yardimli
22	Goranboy	47	Neftchala	72	Yevlakh
23	Goychay	48	Oguz	75/85	**Nakhchivan**
24	Hajigabul	49	Saatly	99	Azerbaijan (Nationwide)
25	Goygol	50	Sumqayit		
26	Khachmaz	51	Samukh		

== Types of plates ==
- Government Officials – Composed as 10 AA 100
- Ministry of Internal Affairs – Composed as 10 AZ 100, 10 AN 100, 10 AE 100, 10 AP 100
- Ministry of Defence – Composed as 10 AM 100 or A 100 SX
- Police Department – Composed as 10 AP 100
- Ministry of Justice – Composed as 10 AO 100
- Presidential Administration – Composed as 10 PA 100
- President's Secret Service – Composed as 10 PM 100
- State Security Service – Composed as 10 AS 100
- Traffic Police – Composed as 10 YP 100
- Diplomats – Composed as 001 D 001 with a red number plate (001 being Turkey)
- Technical number plates of Embassies – 013 T 010 with a red number plate (013 being United Nations)
- Ambassador or relative of an ambassador of a country – 002 SFR 001 with a red number plate (002 being France)
- Trailers – Composed the same way as usual Azerbaijan plates, but with no hyphen and in a rectangular shape
- Foreign series – Composed of the letter H, three numbers a space and three more numbers with a yellow number plate, composed as H 023 100
- Public Transport – Blue number plate
- Motorcycle – Composed 10 A 100
