= Azerbaijani passport =

Travel document

Azerbaijani passport; Azərbaycan pasportu
- The front cover of a contemporary Republic of Azerbaijan biometric passport (from 2021)

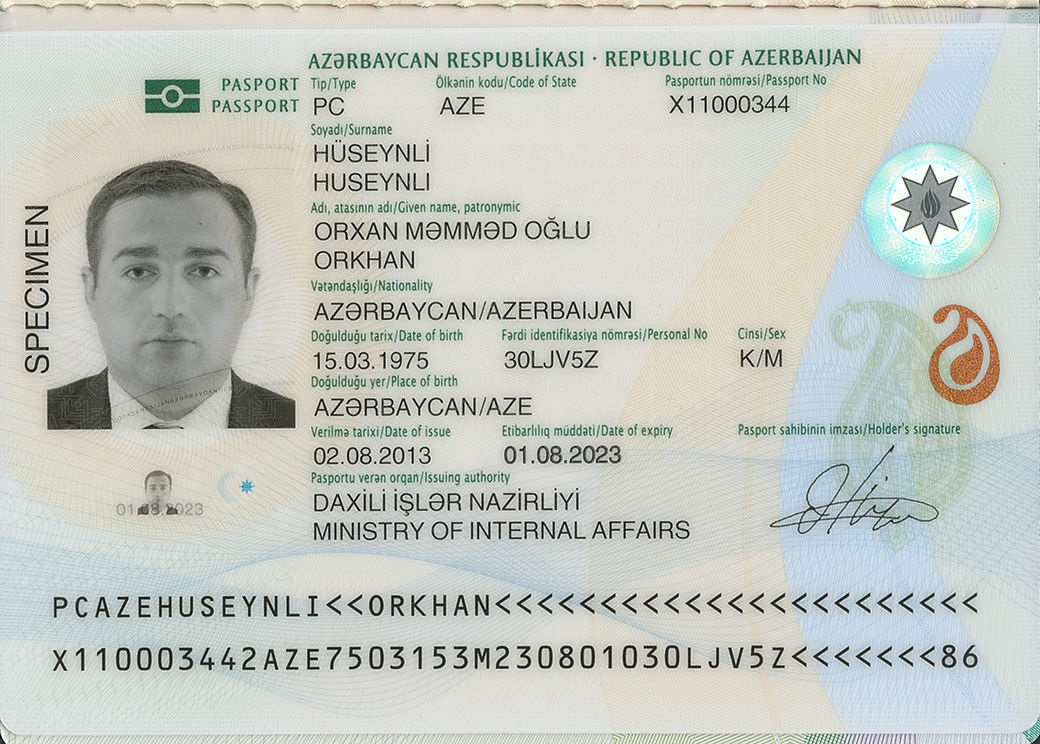
- The data page of the latest version of the Azerbaijani biometric passport.
- Type: Passport
- Issued by: (Azerbaijan) Ministry of Internal Affairs
- First issued: 28 May 1991; 1 September 2013 (biometric passports)
- Purpose: Identification, international travel
- Valid in: All countries
- Eligibility: Azerbaijani citizenship
- Expiration: 1 year period (children under age of 1); 3 years period (children under age of 3); 5 years period (children under age of 3-18); 10 years period (individuals over the age of 18)
- Cost: Within 10 working days: AZN 15 (children <1 year of age); AZN 25 (1-3 years of age); AZN 35 (3-18 years of age); AZN 60 (individuals >18 years of age)

The Republic of Azerbaijan passport (Azerbaijani: Azərbaycan Respublikası pasportu) is issued by the Ministry of Internal Affairs of Azerbaijan to the citizens of Azerbaijan for international travel. Ordinary passports are valid for 10 years (since 2007) from the date of issue and contain 34 visa pages. Passport content is printed both in Azerbaijani and in English. It acts as proof of the passport holder's information, confirming the identity of the citizen outside the territory of the Republic of Azerbaijan. As of 12 May 2023, Azerbaijani citizens had visa-free or visa on arrival access to 80 countries and territories, ranking the Azerbaijani passport 59th in terms of travel freedom according to the Henley Passport Index.

== Types of passports ==
- Ordinary passport: Issued to normal citizens.
  - Ordinary passports are issued in two different lengths of validity: five and ten years. Azerbaijani citizens up to 18 years of age can only be issued a five-year passport, while those who are 18 years of age or older can obtain a ten-year passport.
- Official passport: Issued to public servants.
- Diplomatic passport: Issued to diplomats and their family members, as well as high-level government officials.

== Physical appearance ==
The coat of arms of Azerbaijan is printed in relief on the center of the front cover with "Azərbaycan Respublikası" in Azerbaijani and "Republic of Azerbaijan" in English above the coat of arms along with "PASPORT" and "PASSPORT" printed below.

The passport is 88 x 125 mm in size, with 54 pages.

Azerbaijani passports can be one of several colors, depending on type: ordinary passports are dark green, official passports are dark blue, and diplomatic passports are dark red.

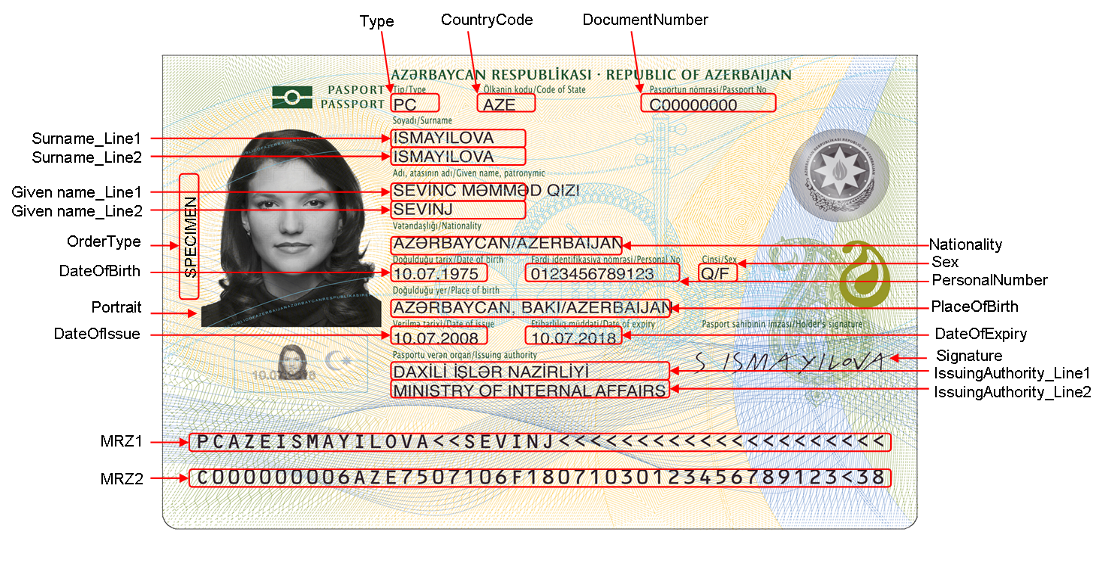
The description data page of the Azerbaijani biometric passport.

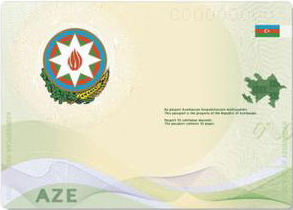
The first page of the Azerbaijani e-passport.

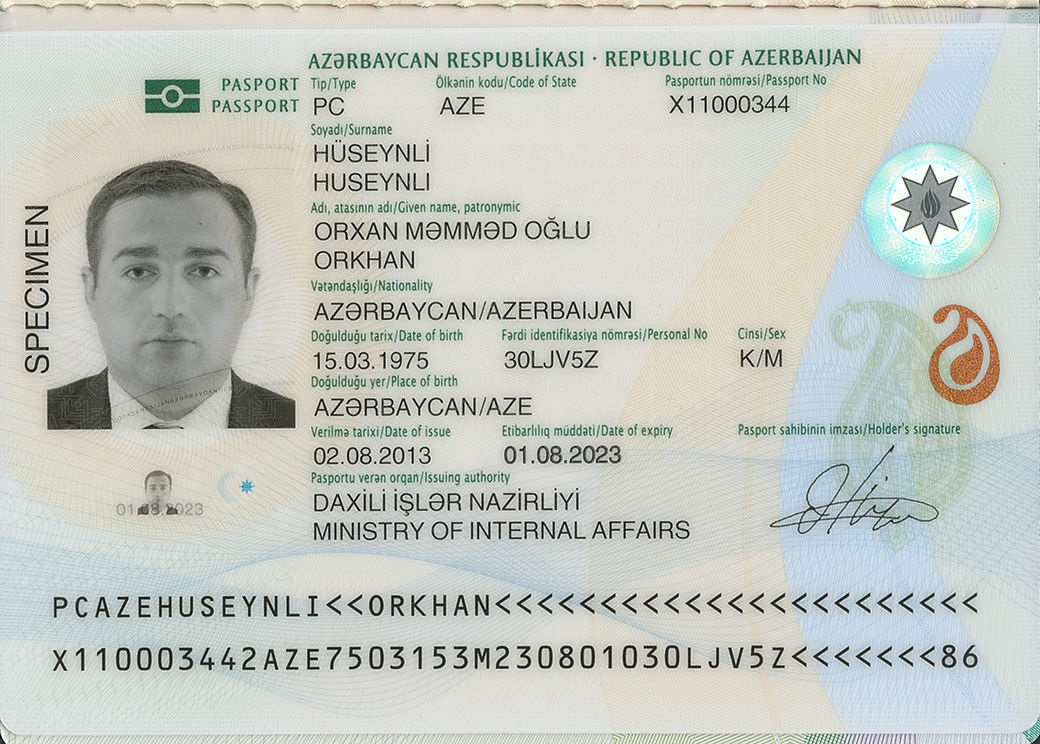
The data page of the Azerbaijani biometric passport.

== Information page ==
Azerbaijani passports include the following data on the information page:

- Photograph of the holder (digital image printed on page)
- Type (P)
- Passport number
- Surname
- Given names
- Date of birth
- Sex
- Place of birth (only the city or town is listed, even if the holder was born outside of Republic of Azerbaijan)
- Date of issue
- Date of expiry
- Holder's signature (digital image printed on page)
- Machine Readable Zone starting with P<AZE

== Biometric passport ==
Biometric Azerbaijani passports were announced on 17 July 2012.

The new passport booklet design is in compliance with ICAO Doc 9303. The e-passport sign, indicating the presence of a RFID chip, is placed on the cover of the passport, as well as above the photo of the holder on the main rigid information page which contains the RFID chip. It also contains a machine readable zone at the bottom of the page. The overall design of the new booklet, apart from the above-mentioned features, does not differ from the previous non-biometric booklet design.

== Visa requirements ==
Visa requirements for Azerbaijani citizens Azerbaijan Visa free access Visa on arrival eVisa Visa available both on arrival or online Visa required Special entry permit required

As of April 2023, Azerbaijani citizens had visa-free or visa on arrival access to 69 countries and territories, ranking the Azerbaijani passport 73rd in terms of travel freedom according to the Henley Passport Index.

== See also ==
- Visa requirements for Azerbaijani citizens
- Visa policy of Azerbaijan
- Azerbaijan identity card
- Azerbaijani nationality law
- Passports in Europe
