= Schweizer Monat =

Swiss monthly newspaper

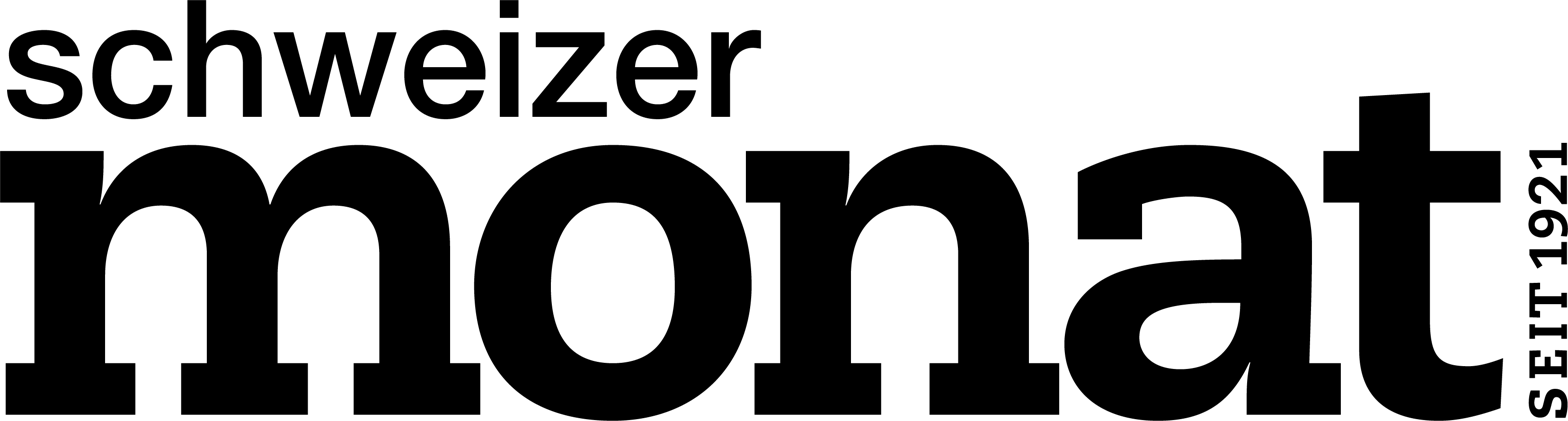
- Type: magazine (10 times per year)
- Publisher: SMH Verlag AG
- Editor: Ronnie Grob
- Founded: 1921; 105 years ago (initially as Schweizerische Monatshefte für Politik und Kultur)
- Relaunched: 2011; 15 years ago
- Political alignment: Classical liberalism
- Language: German
- Headquarters: Zürich
- Circulation: circa 6,500
- ISSN: 0036-7400
- Website: schweizermonat.ch
- Free online archives: http://www.schweizermonat.ch/archiv

The Schweizer Monat. Die Autorenzeitschrift für Politik, Wirtschaft und Kultur ("Swiss Month. Author magazine for Politics, Economy and Culture"), née Schweizer Monatshefte, is a Swiss monthly magazine based in Zürich. Founded in 1921 and relaunched in 2011, it maintains a liberal point of view and is edited by Ronnie Grob.

Former and current authors include:

- Nobel laureates such as Friedrich August von Hayek, James M. Buchanan, Gary Becker, Vernon Smith, Mario Vargas Llosa and Muhammad Yunu
- Literary figures such as Hermann Hesse, Hugo Loetscher, Hermann Burger, Adolf Muschg, Peter von Matt, Hans Magnus Enzensberger, Adam Johnson, Christian Kracht, Klaus Modick, Peter Stamm, Jonas Lüscher, Monika Hausammann and Thomas Hürlimann
- Scientists and intellectuals such as Karl Popper, Wilhelm Röpke, Theodor W. Adorno, Ralf Dahrendorf, Steven Pinker, Michael Graziano, Deirdre McCloskey, Niall Ferguson, Sherry Turkle, Boris Groys, Nassim Nicholas Taleb, Herfried Münkler, Ulrich Beck and Peter Sloterdijk.

Each issue contains interviews with:

- Swiss entrepreneurs like Daniel Borel, Thomas Schmidheiny and Rolf Soiron
- Politicians like Pascal Couchepin, Adrienne Clarkson, Gerhard Schröder and Cédric Wermuth
- Economists like Michael Porter, Parag Khanna and Deirdre McCloskey
- Intellectuals like Philipp Sarasin, Norbert Bolz, Rolf Dobelli and Matt Ridley
- Scientists like Didier Sornette and Gerd Folkers.
