= CIS-EMO =

Organization

Commonwealth of the Independent States - Election Monitoring Organization (CIS-EMO) — is an international non-governmental organization founded by the Commonwealth of Independent States. CIS-EMO conducts election observation missions and prepares reports, which sometimes conflict with the findings of Western election monitoring organizations. It was founded in 2003 in Nizhny Novgorod, Russia and was led by Aleksey Kochetkov. As an NGO, it is different from other observers sent by the CIS. CIS-EMO "tried to legitimise practices of electoral authoritarianism and always remained loyal to the objectives of Russia’s foreign policy in the post-Soviet space".

== CIS-EMO International Monitoring Missions ==
CIS-EMO participated in observing the following elections:

- Parliament elections in the Republic of Kazakhstan, 2004
- President elections in Ukraine, 2004
- Parliament elections in the Republic of Kyrgyzstan, 2005
- Parliament elections in the Republic of Moldova, 2005
- President elections in the Republic of Kyrgyzstan, 2005
- Mayor elections in Kishinev, Moldova, 2005
- Municipal elections in Estonia, 2005
- Parliament elections in the Republic of Azerbaijan, 2005
- President elections in the Republic of Kazakhstan, 2005
- Parliament elections in Transnistria, 2005
- Parliament elections in Ukraine, 2006
- Referendum on independence in Transnistria, 2006
- President elections in Transnistria, 2006
- President elections in Russia, 2008
- Parliament elections in Volgograd Oblast, Russia, 2009
- Parliament elections in Arkhangelsk Oblast, Russia, 2009
- Mayor elections in Kostroma, Russia, 2009
- Parliament elections in Vladimir Oblast, Russia, 2009
- Parliament elections in the Republic of Tatarstan, Russia, 2009
- Parliament elections in the Kabardino-Balkaria Republic, Russia, 2009
- Elections to Moscow City Hall, Russia, 2009
- Parliament elections in South Ossetia, 2009
- Parliament elections in Germany, 2009
- Municipal elections in Estonia, 2009
- President elections in Abkhazia, 2009
- President elections in Ukraine, 2010
- Parliament elections in Ryazan Oblast, Russia, 2010
- Parliament elections in Voronezh Oblast, Russia, 2010
- Referendum on changing the Constitution in Kyrgyzstan, 2010
- Parliament elections in Kyrgyzstan, 2010
- Municipal elections in Ukraine, 2010
- Regional elections in Ukraine, 2010
- Parliament elections in Belgorod Oblast, Russia, 2010
- Parliament elections in Chelyabinsk Oblast, Russia, 2010
- Parliament elections in Estonia, 2011
- Parliament elections in Turkey, 2011
- President elections in Abkhazia, 2011
- Parliament elections in Poland, 2011
- President elections in South Ossetia, 2011
- President elections in Transnistria, 2011
- Parliament elections in Abkhazia, 2012
- President elections in South Ossetia, 2012
- President elections in France, 2012
- Parliamentary elections in Ukraine, 2012

== EU Important Members of CIS-EMO Missions ==
Status on the moment of participation.

- Ján Čarnogurský, former Prime-minister, Slovakia
- Leszek Miller, former Prime-minister, Poland
- Andrzej Lepper, former vice-Prime-minister, Poland
- Paul-Marie Coûteaux, member of EU Parliament, France
- Sabine Lösing, member of EU Parliament, Germany
- Giulietto Chiesa, member of EU Parliament, Italy
- Sylwester Chruszcz, member of EU Parliament, Poland
- Alexander Mirsky, member of EU Parliament, Latvia
- Frank Schwalba-Hoth, former member of EU Parliament, Germany
- Jean-Mari Perrin, former ambassador of France in Azerbaijan and Estonia, France
- Thierry Mariani, member of National Assembly, France
- Michel Voisin, member of National Assembly, France, head of Delegation, the Delegation of France to the OSCE PA, France
- Bogusław Kowalski, member of Sejm, Poland
- Waldemar Kraska, senator, Poland
- Aldis Adamovich, Mayor of Preiļi, Latvia
- François-Xavier Coquin, Professor, College de France, France
- Mirca Margesku, Professor, France
- Olivier Vedrine, Professor, France
- Olivier Decrock, expert, France
- Marie-Helen Berard, Foundation Jacques Chirac, France
- Luca Bionda, Doctor of Political Science, Italy
- Stefano Vernole, expert, Italy
- Pawel Reszka, journalist, Poland
- Rainer Rupp, journalist, Germany

== CIS-EMO Activities ==
CIS-EMO participates and organizes different events such as:

- Round table in the European Parliament ‘Controlled Democracy in Russia?’, March 2009, Brussels;
- International conference ‘ Civic institutions in the election process. Control and maintaining’ in the Public Chamber of Russia, January 2009, Moscow;
- Conference ‘ Voting for democracy? ’, December 2009, Berlin;
- Round table ‘Dynamics in the developing of the democratic institutions in the Republic of South Ossetia in the first year after having been recognized’, May 2009, Tskhinvali;
- Round table ‘Investment potential of South Ossetia: complex approach, problems and perspectives’, 2010, Tskhinvali;
- School of international observers, September, 2010, Kyrgyzstan;
- OSCE Supplementary Human Dimension Meeting, July 2008, Vienna;
- Supplementary Human Dimension Meeting on Democratic Lawmaking, OSCE, November 2008, Vienna;
- Round table ‘ Civil Society in Law System of Modern Europe’, January 2009, Athens;
- Election conference of the party ‘European Left’, 2009, Berlin;
- International conference ‘Global Europe’, EUP, 2009, Brussels;
- Forum ‘European Union and Russia: new perspectives’, EUP, 2009, Brussels;
- Yaroslavl Global Policy Forum - ‘Modern State: standards of democracy and criteria of effectiveness’, September 2009, Yaroslavl;
- Review Conference, September 2010, Warsaw;
- Forum for Security Co-operation, OSCE, October 2011, Warsaw;
- Round table ‘Election Systems of States of Old Democracy’, RIA Novosti, February, 2012, Moscow.

== See also ==
- Election monitoring
- Aleksey Kochetkov
