= Barxudarlı =

Abandoned Azerbaijani village in Qazakh District

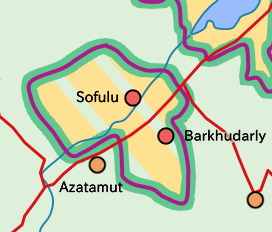

- Location within Azerbaijan
- Coordinates: 40°59′36″N 045°13′31″E
- Country (de jure): Azerbaijan
  - District: Qazax
- Country (de facto): Armenia
  - Province: Tavush
- Time zone: UTC+4 (AZT)

Barkhudarly (Azerbaijani: Barxudarlı; Armenian: Բարխուդարլու, romanized: Barkhudarlu) is an abandoned Azerbaijani village in the Qazakh District of Azerbaijan, under the de facto control of Armenia. Sofulu and Barxudarlı, together, form a 22 square kilometres (8.5 sq mi) exclave of Azerbaijan surrounded by Armenia's Tavush Province.

== History ==
Following a four-day siege, the village was captured by the Armenian Armed Forces on 27 April 1992, during the First Nagorno-Karabakh War. The exclave has been under the control of Armenia ever since and is administered as part of the surrounding Tavush Province.
