= Sofulu, Qazax =

Sofulu
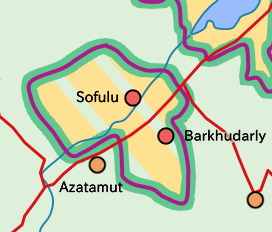
- Interactive map of Sofulu
- Location within Azerbaijan
- Coordinates: 41°00′03″N 45°12′51″E
- Country (de jure): Azerbaijan
  - District: Qazax
- Country (de facto): Armenia
  - Province: Tavush
  - Municipality: Ijevan
- Time zone: UTC+4 (AZT)

Sofulu (Armenian: Սոֆուլու) is an abandoned Azerbaijani village in the Qazakh District of Azerbaijan. It is located within the exclave of Barxudarlı, fully surrounded by the Tavush Province of Armenia. It has been under the control of Armenia since the First Nagorno-Karabakh War. Today, the village is de facto administered as part of the Tavush Province under the same name.
