= Aleksey Kochetkov =

Russian political analyst (born 1971)

Aleksey Vladimirovich Kochetkov (Russian: Алексей Владимирович Кочетков; born 8 September 1971). Aleksey Kochetkov is a former engineer and political analyst well known for his closeness to official Russian policy under President Putin. He has often written in support Russia's occupation of Georgia, and also in support of pro-Moscow conspiracy theories in his book Neo-nazis and Maidan.

He is a Russian political scientist, publicist. He was the general director of Commonwealth of the Independent States - Election Monitoring Organization set up with Russian government backing as an alternative to the OSCE from 2003 till 2013. He is the researcher and the author of some modern methodologies of election monitoring processes and election campaigns. In 2013 he headed the Foundation for Development Civil Society Institutions "Public Diplomacy".

== Biography ==
Aleksey Kochetkov was born in 1971 in Moscow.

1989-1994 – Moscow Power Engineering Institute.

In 1992 Kochetkov was an editor of the Russkiy poryadok (Russian order) - a newspaper of the RNE, Russian fascist organization, of which he was a top member.

In October 1993 he participated in the 1993 Russian constitutional crisis. He was arrested and during 5 months stayed in Lefortovo prison. He was released by to the State Duma political amnesty, for participants of 1993 Russian constitutional crisis on February 23, 1994.

In 1995 Kochetkov was expelled from the RNE for alleged collaboration with Russian security services.

Beginning from 1996 he started a career as a "person involved in political consultancy promoting various candidates at elections in Russia". Kochetkov participated in PR projects as a PR manager throughout the country-Leningrad, Pskov, Arkhangelsk, Vologda, Kemerovo, Primorsky krai and others. He worked in the State Duma as a consultant. Kochetkov was in contact with Russian ultranationalists.

1999-2002 was a head of the news agency ‘Kamenny Ostrov’ in Saint Petersburg.

In 2004, he founded International Monitoring Organization CIS-EMO, which "tried to legitimise practices of electoral authoritarianism and always remained loyal to the objectives of Russia’s foreign policy in the post-Soviet space".

CIS-EMO played a minor role as an observer during the 2004 election campaign in Ukraine around the time of the Orange Revolution. Kochetkov was sent by Moscow to support Yanukovych and his Party of Regions. He said he was beaten by violent supporters of the "orange revolution", a circumstance which went largely unnoticed in the Western press and even led to him being accused by certain newsagencies of having staged it. Kochetkov's support of election candidate was against "the principles of international election observation that insist on the strict impartiality of observers and unacceptability of any bias or preference in relation to political contenders".

After the Orange Revolution in Ukraine Kochetkov started cooperating with Modest Kolerov.

In 2005, during monitoring the Chişinău mayor elections, Kochetkov was suddenly arrested by the Information and Security Service of the Republic of Moldova , and jailed but released some days later in the absence of any formal charge.

In August 2008, he was an organizer of the international Press-Center ‘Tskhinval-2008’. Later this center was given to the Ministry of Communication of the Republic of South Ossetia.

In 2008, he became the chief of the Centre for Monitoring of Democratic Processes ‘Quorum’. The organization was set up as a counterweight to the OSCE. Aleksey Kochetkov was a participant of a number of international conferences, including in EUP, OSCE.

As a head of the international election monitoring mission of CIS-EMO participated in more than 50 missions in countries of CIS and EU.

== Writings ==
Kochetkov's books repeat Kremlin official narrative about neighborhood countries. He falsely represents Ukraine as built on nationalism ideology, and falsely represents nationalism as Nazism or fascism.

He is the author of books and monographs like:

- South Ossetia: Armed Aggression and Peacekeeping War
- Transnistrian Moldavian Republic: Law Bases of Independence’ Recognition
- In the Center of Echo: Elections in Ukraine, 2010
- Dynamics in the developing of the democratic institutions in the Republic of South Ossetia in the first year after having been recognized
- Abkhazian presidential elections, 2011
- S. Byshok, A. Kochetkov. «Neonazis & Euromaidan: From Democracy to Dictatorship». ISBN 978-5-8041-0709-4. The book "exaggerates and sensationalises" the role of far-right groups in Ukrainian Euromaidan.

== Awards and honors ==
- In 2008 Aleksey Kochetkov was awarded a Medal ‘For Serving the Peace in South Ossetia’ by the President of South Ossetia Eduard Kokoity.
- In 2009 he was honored by the ‘Friendship Order’ of the Republic of South Ossetia by the President of South Ossetia.
- In 2010 he was presented with the ‘Letter of Thanks’ by the Head of the President Administration of the Russian Federation, Sergey Naryshkin, for strengthening of friendship and co-operation with foreign countries.
- In 2007 he received ‘Letter of Thanks’ from the Head of the Central Election Commission of Russia, Vladimir Churov for participation in organization of elections to State Duma of the Russian Federation.
- In 2008 he received ‘Letter of Thanks’ from the Head of the Central Election Commission of Russia, Vladimir Churov for participation in organization of President elections of the Russian Federation.
- In 2009 he received ‘Letter of Thanks’ from the Head of the Central Election Commission of Russia, Vladimir Churov for participation in organization of the United Day of Voting (regional elections in Russia).

== See also ==
- Election monitoring
- CIS-EMO
