= List of diplomatic missions of Azerbaijan =

The first Azerbaijani diplomatic mission was established in 1918 when Azerbaijan became a republic and the parliament sent a diplomatic delegation to the Ottoman Empire.

Today Azerbaijan has over 70 diplomatic missions around the world, with a particular focus on European and Asian countries.

This is a list of diplomatic missions of Azerbaijan.

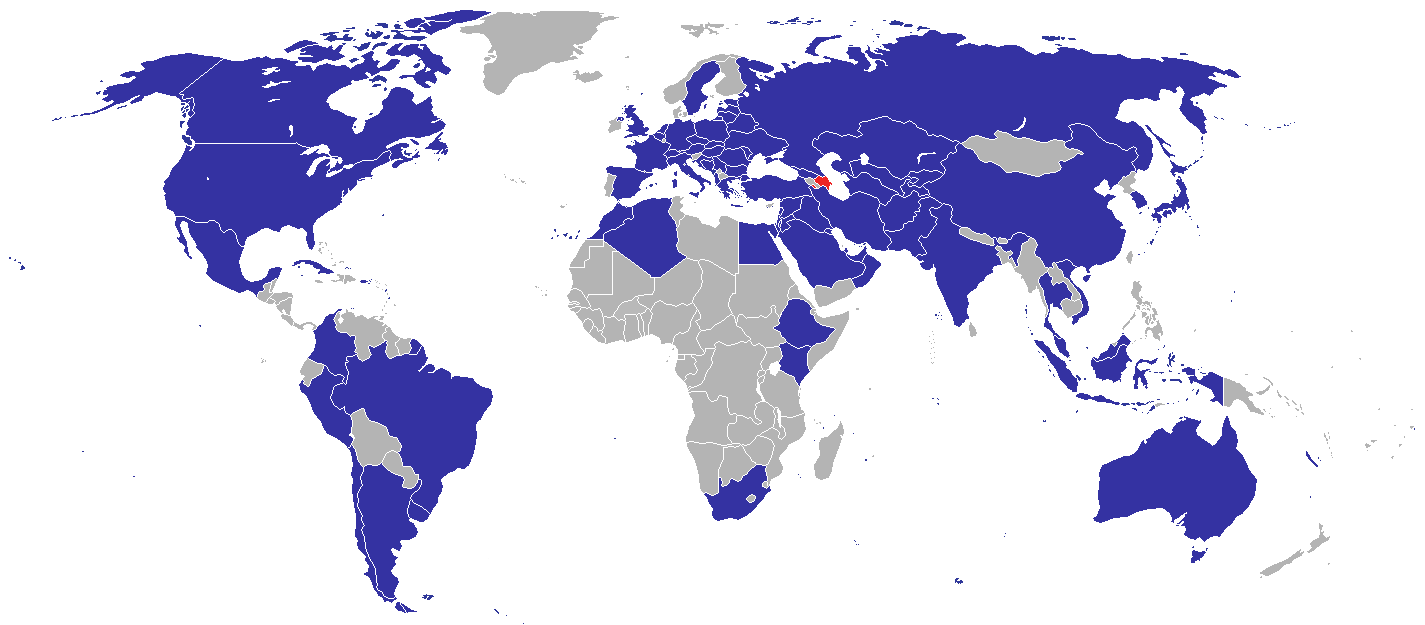
States hosting diplomatic missions of Azerbaijan

== Current missions ==
=== Africa ===
Host country	Host city	Mission	Concurrent accreditation	Ref.
Algeria	Algiers	Embassy	Countries: Mauritania; Tunisia	
Egypt	Cairo	Embassy	Countries: Sudan; International organizations: Arab League (Note: Accredited as an observer mission.)	
Ethiopia	Addis Ababa	Embassy	Countries: Djibouti; Rwanda; International organizations: African Union	
Kenya	Nairobi	Embassy	Countries: Congo-Brazzaville; International organizations: United Nations; United Nations Environment Programme; United Nations Human Settlements Programme	
Morocco	Rabat	Embassy	Countries: Gambia; Senegal; International organizations: ISESCO	
South Africa	Pretoria	Embassy	Countries: Angola; Eswatini; Mozambique; Zimbabwe	

=== Americas ===
Host country	Host city	Mission	Concurrent accreditation	Ref.
Argentina	Buenos Aires	Embassy	Countries: Chile; Bolivia; Paraguay; Uruguay	
Brazil	Brasília	Embassy	Countries: Ecuador; Guyana; Suriname; Trinidad and Tobago	
Canada	Ottawa	Embassy	International organizations: International Civil Aviation Organization	
Chile	Santiago de Chile	Embassy office (Note: Subordinate to the embassy in Buenos Aires, Argentina.)		
Colombia	Bogotá	Embassy office (Note: Subordinate to the embassy in Mexico City, Mexico.)		
Cuba	Havana	Embassy	Countries: Dominican Republic; Venezuela; International organizations: Caribbean Community	
Mexico	Mexico City	Embassy	Countries: Colombia; Costa Rica; Guatemala; Honduras; Panama; Peru	
Peru	Lima	Embassy office		
United States	Washington, D.C.	Embassy	International organizations: Organization of American States (Note: Accredited as an observer mission.)	
United States	Los Angeles	Consulate–General	International organizations: Organization of American States	
Uruguay	Montevideo	Embassy office		

=== Asia ===
Host country	Host city	Mission	Concurrent accreditation	Ref.
Afghanistan	Kabul	Embassy		
Bahrain	Manama	Embassy		
China	Beijing	Embassy	Countries: North Korea	
Georgia	Tbilisi	Embassy		
Georgia	Batumi	Consulate–General		
India	New Delhi	Embassy	Countries: Bangladesh; Bhutan; Maldives; Nepal; Sri Lanka	
Indonesia	Jakarta	Embassy	Countries: Philippines; Singapore; Timor-Leste; International organizations: Association of Southeast Asian Nations	
Iran	Tehran	Embassy	International organizations: Economic Cooperation Organization	
Iran	Tabriz	Consulate–General	International organizations: Economic Cooperation Organization	
Iraq	Baghdad	Embassy		
Israel	Tel Aviv	Embassy		
Japan	Tokyo	Embassy		
Jordan	Amman	Embassy		
Kazakhstan	Astana	Embassy		
Kazakhstan	Aktau	Consulate–General		
Kazakhstan	Almaty	Embassy office		
Kuwait	Kuwait City	Embassy		
Kyrgyzstan	Bishkek	Embassy		
Lebanon	Beirut	Embassy		
Malaysia	Ampang (Note: The embassy is located outside Kuala Lumpur’s administrative borders and it’s located in the city of Ampang Jaya in Selangor state.)	Embassy	Countries: Brunei; Myanmar	
Oman	Muscat	Embassy		
Pakistan	Islamabad	Embassy		
Palestine	Ramallah	Representative office		
Qatar	Doha	Embassy		
Saudi Arabia	Riyadh	Embassy	International organizations: Organisation of Islamic Cooperation	
Saudi Arabia	Jeddah	Embassy office	International organizations: Organisation of Islamic Cooperation	
South Korea	Seoul	Embassy	Countries: Mongolia	
Syria	Damascus	Embassy		
Tajikistan	Dushanbe	Embassy		
Thailand	Bangkok	Embassy	International organizations: UN Economic and Social Commission for Asia and the Pacific	
Turkey	Ankara	Embassy	International organizations: BSEC (Note: The consulate-general in Istanbul has accredited to BSEC.)	
Turkey	Istanbul	Consulate–General	International organizations: BSEC	
Turkey	Kars	Consulate–General	International organizations: BSEC	
Turkey	Iğdır	Consular Mission	International organizations: BSEC	
Turkmenistan	Ashgabat	Embassy		
United Arab Emirates	Abu Dhabi	Embassy	International Organizations: International Renewable Energy Agency	
United Arab Emirates	Dubai	Consulate–General		
Uzbekistan	Tashkent	Embassy		
Vietnam	Hanoi	Embassy	Countries: Cambodia; Laos	

=== Europe ===
Host country	Host city	Mission	Concurrent accreditation	Ref.
Albania	Tirana	Embassy		
Austria	Vienna	Embassy	Countries: Slovenia; International organizations: Organization for Security and Co-operation in Europe; United Nations; International Atomic Energy Agency; United Nations Industrial Development Organization; United Nations Office on Drugs and Crime	
Belarus	Minsk	Embassy	International organizations: Commonwealth of Independent States	
Belgium	Brussels	Embassy	Countries: Luxembourg; International organizations: European Union	
Bosnia and Herzegovina	Sarajevo	Embassy		
Bulgaria	Sofia	Embassy		
Croatia	Zagreb	Embassy		
Czech Republic	Prague	Embassy		
Estonia	Tallinn	Embassy		
France	Paris	Embassy	Countries: Monaco	
Germany	Berlin	Embassy		
Greece	Athens	Embassy		
Holy See (Note: The Azerbaijani Embassy to the Holy See is located outside Vatican territory in Rome.)	Rome	Embassy	Countries: Portugal	
Hungary	Budapest	Embassy		
Italy	Rome	Embassy	Countries: Malta; San Marino; International organizations: Food and Agriculture Organization; International Fund for Agricultural Development; World Food Programme	
Latvia	Riga	Embassy		
Lithuania	Vilnius	Embassy		
Moldova	Chișinău	Embassy		
Montenegro	Podgorica	Embassy office (Note: Subordinate to the embassy in Belgrade, Serbia.)		
Netherlands	The Hague	Embassy	International organizations: Organisation for the Prohibition of Chemical Weapons	
Poland	Warsaw	Embassy		
Romania	Bucharest	Embassy		
Russia	Moscow	Embassy		
Russia	Saint Petersburg	Consulate–General		
Russia	Yekaterinburg	Consulate–General		
Serbia	Belgrade	Embassy	Countries: Montenegro; North Macedonia	
Slovakia	Bratislava	Embassy		
Spain	Madrid	Embassy	Countries: Andorra; International organizations: UN Tourism	
Sweden	Stockholm	Embassy	Countries: Denmark; Finland; Norway	
Switzerland	Bern	Embassy	Countries: Liechtenstein	
Ukraine	Kyiv	Embassy	International organizations: GUAM	
United Kingdom	London	Embassy	Countries: Iceland; Ireland	

=== Oceania ===
Host country	Host city	Mission	Concurrent accreditation	Ref.
Australia	Canberra	Embassy	Countries: New Zealand; Fiji	

=== Multilateral organisations ===
Organization	Host city	Host country	Mission	Concurrent accreditation	Ref.
Council of Europe	Strasbourg	France	Permanent Mission		
NATO	Brussels	Belgium	Mission		
United Nations	New York City	United States	Permanent Mission		
United Nations	Geneva	Switzerland	Permanent Mission		
UNESCO	Paris	France	Permanent Mission		

== Gallery ==
Embassy in Athens

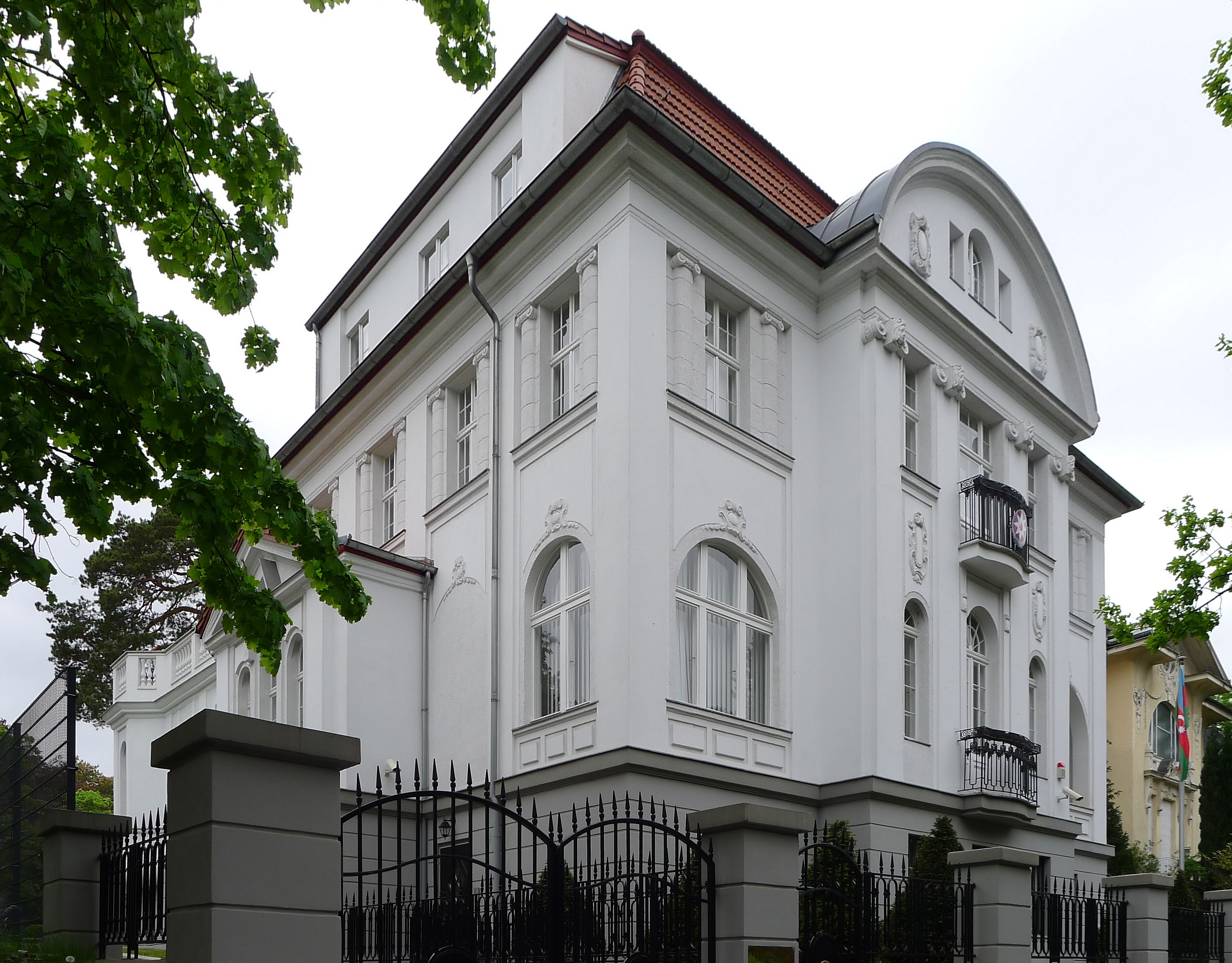
Embassy in Berlin

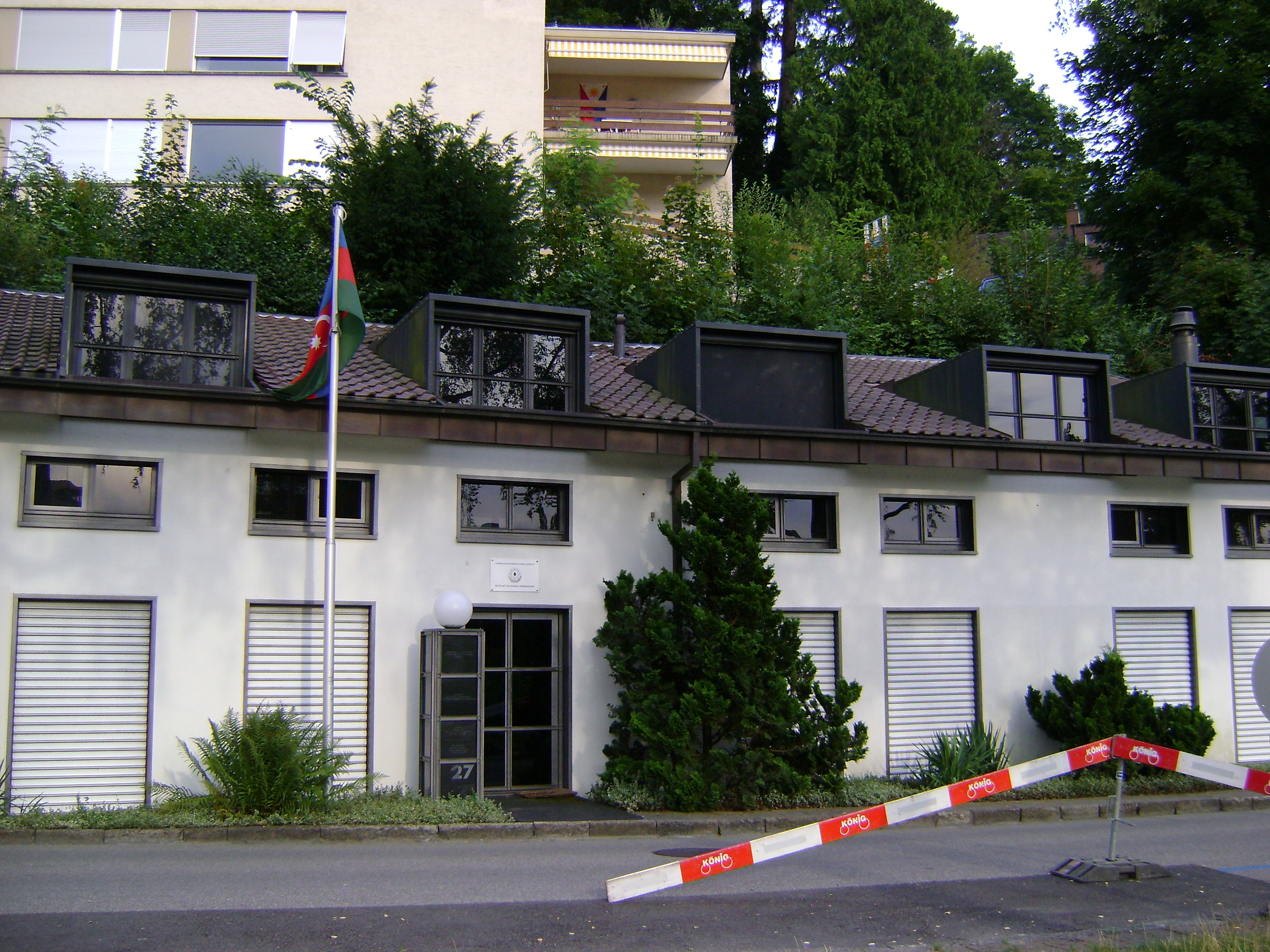
Embassy in Bern

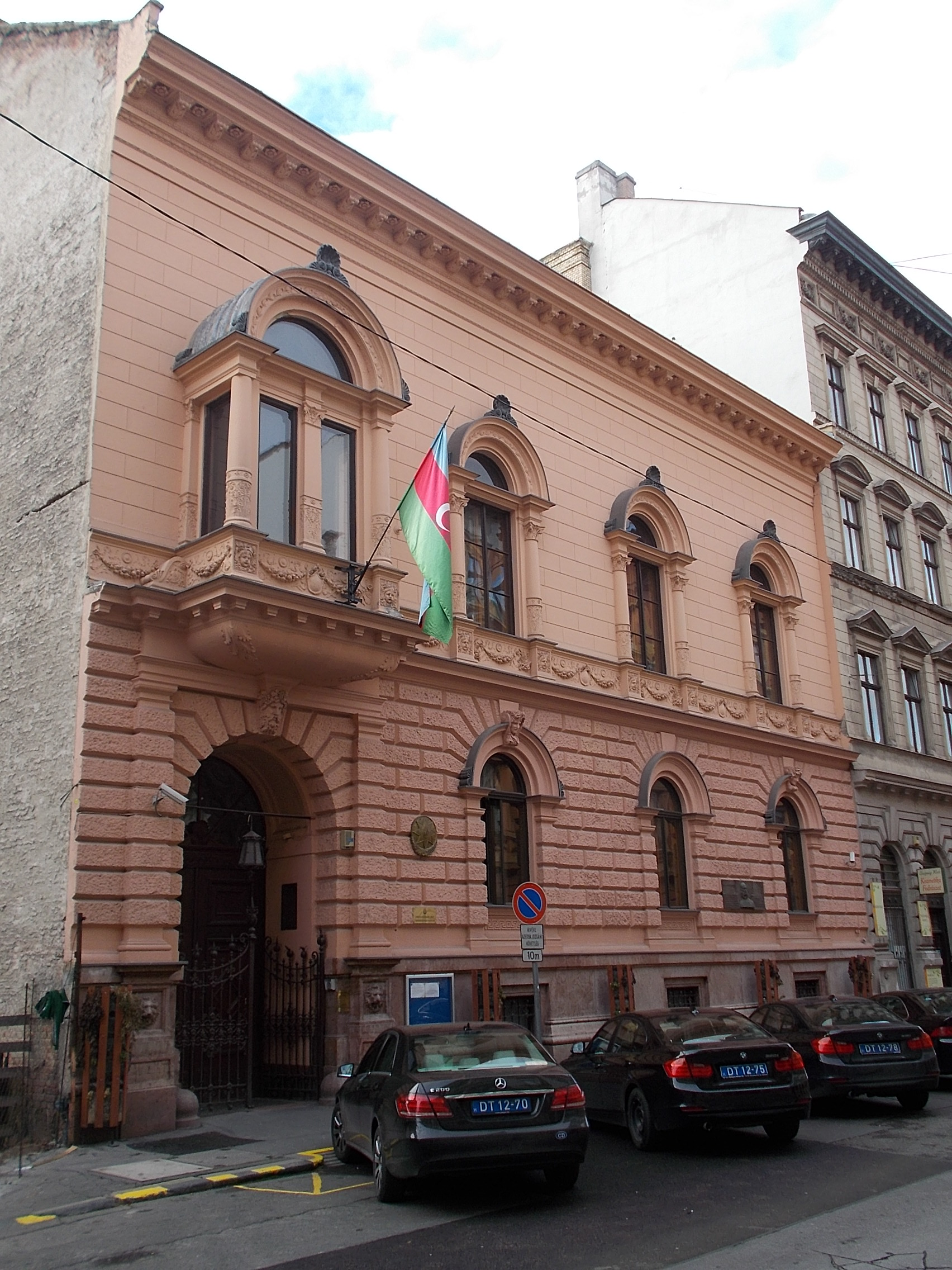
Embassy in Budapest

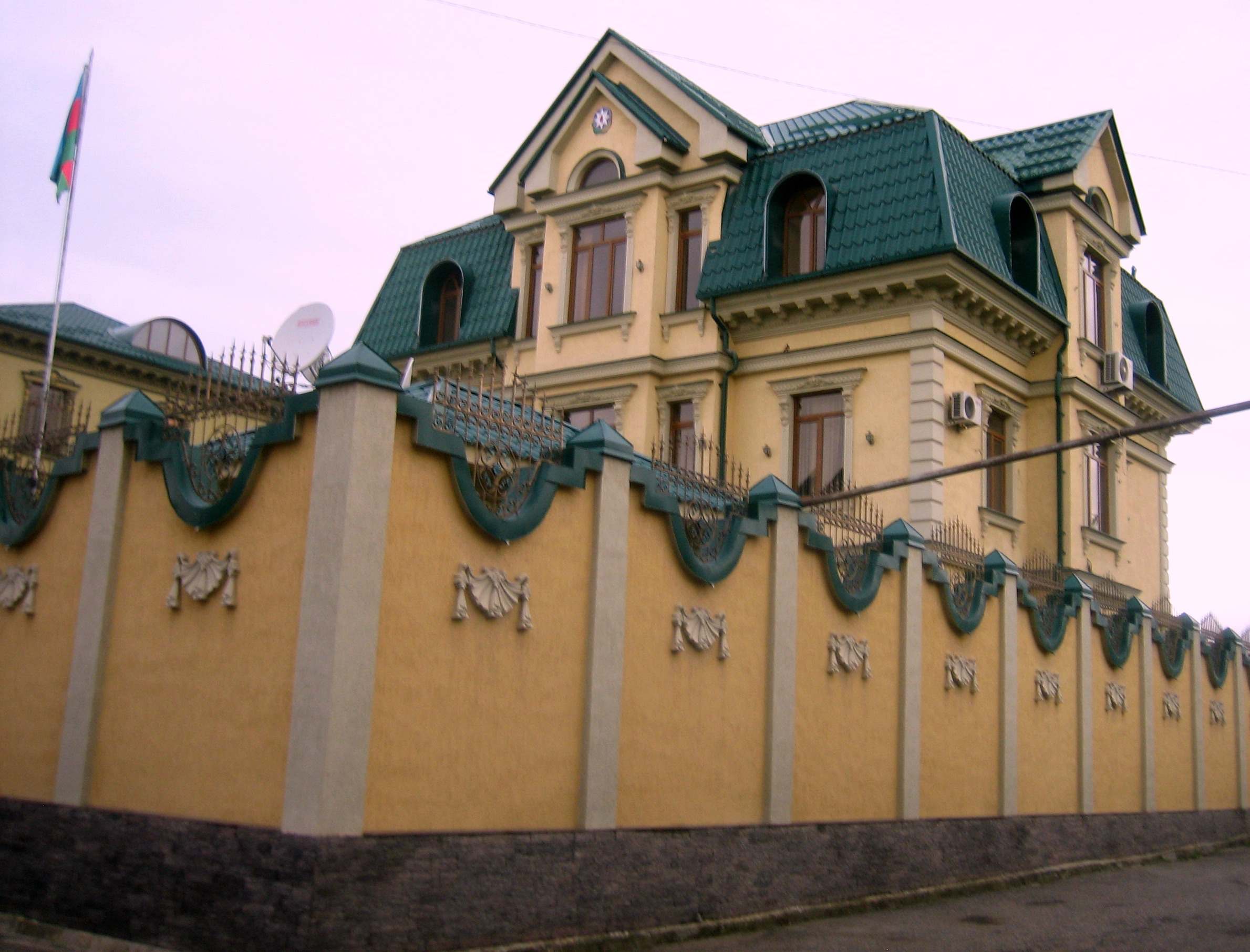
Embassy in Dushanbe

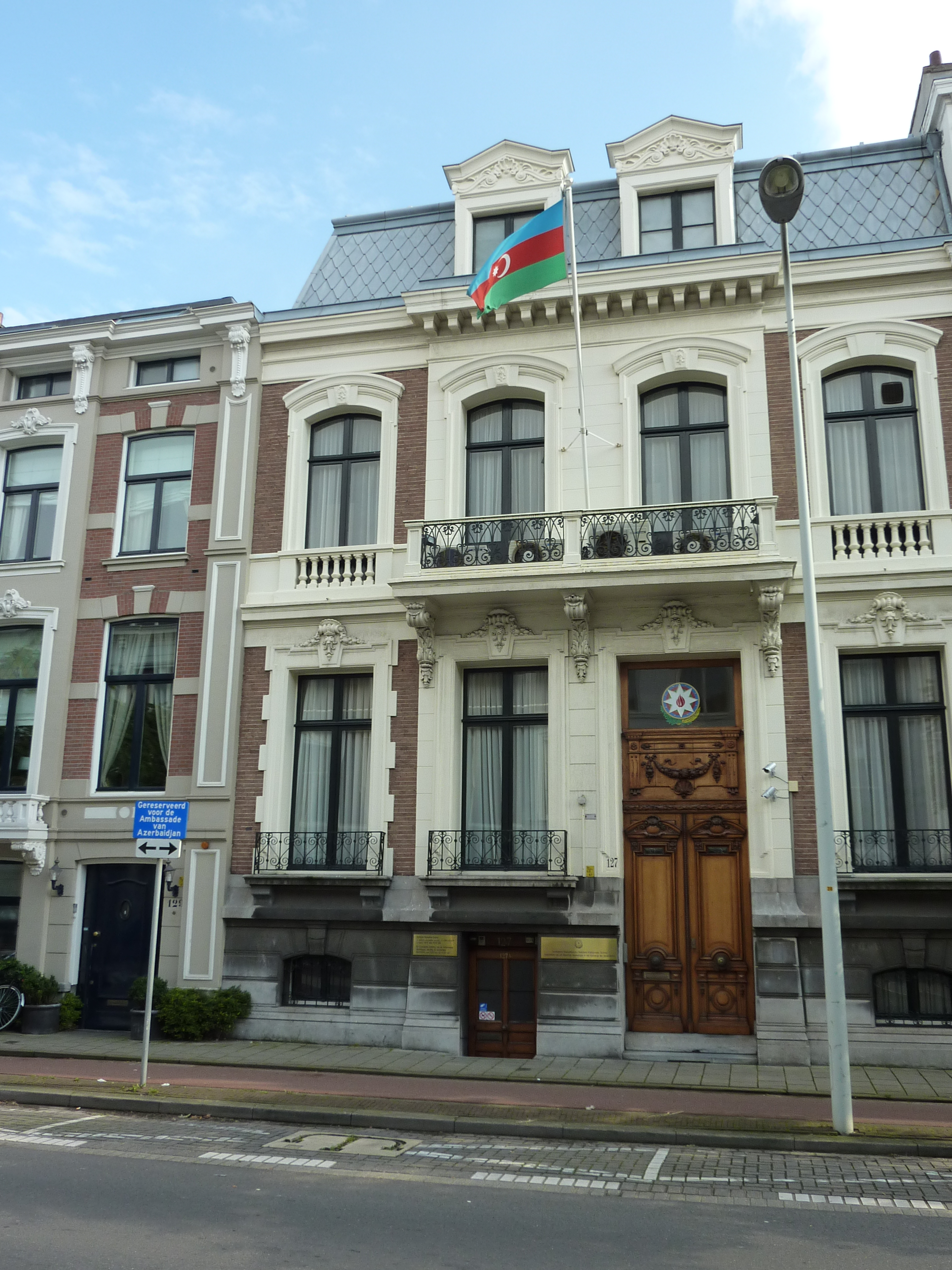
Embassy in The Hague

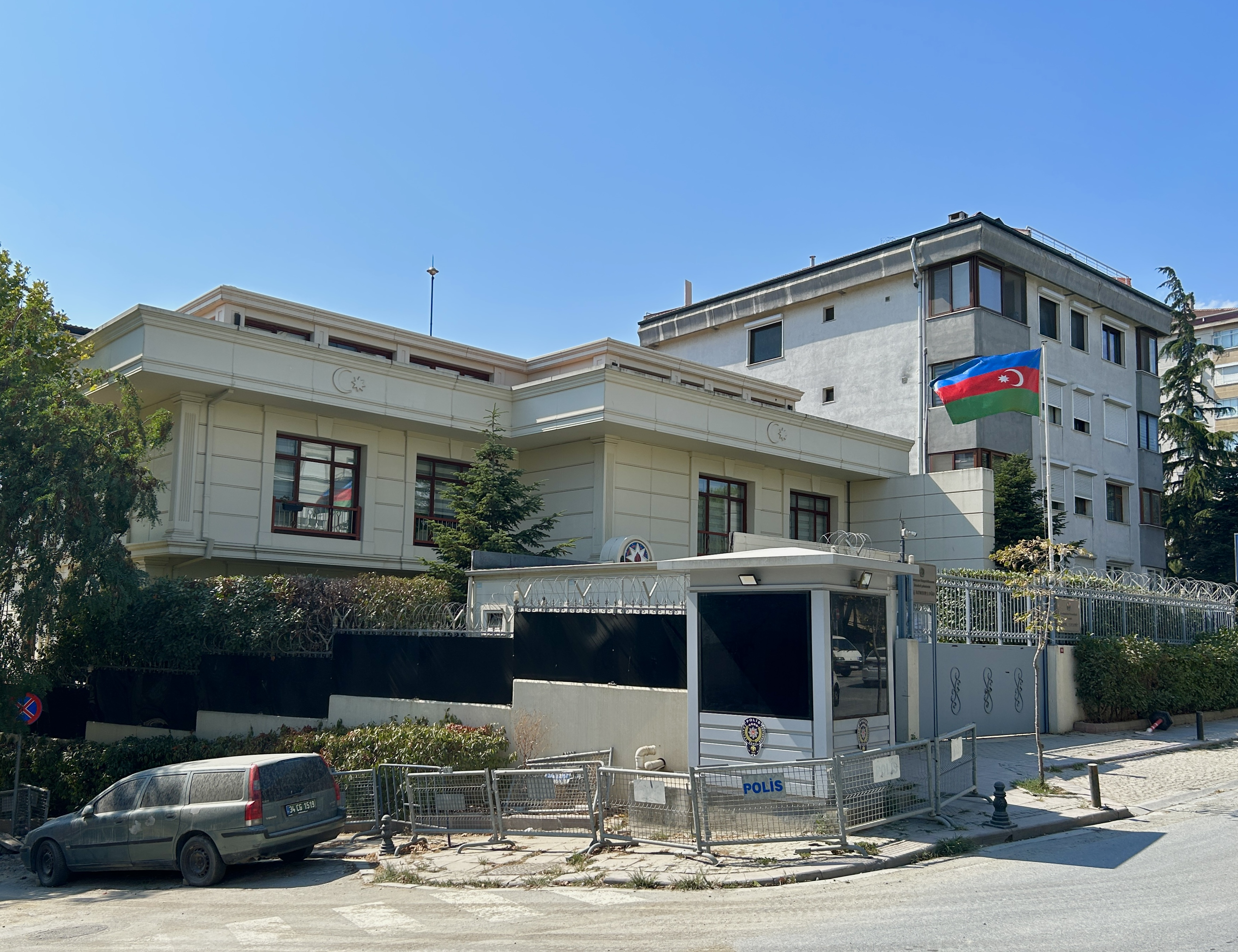
Consulate-General in Istanbul

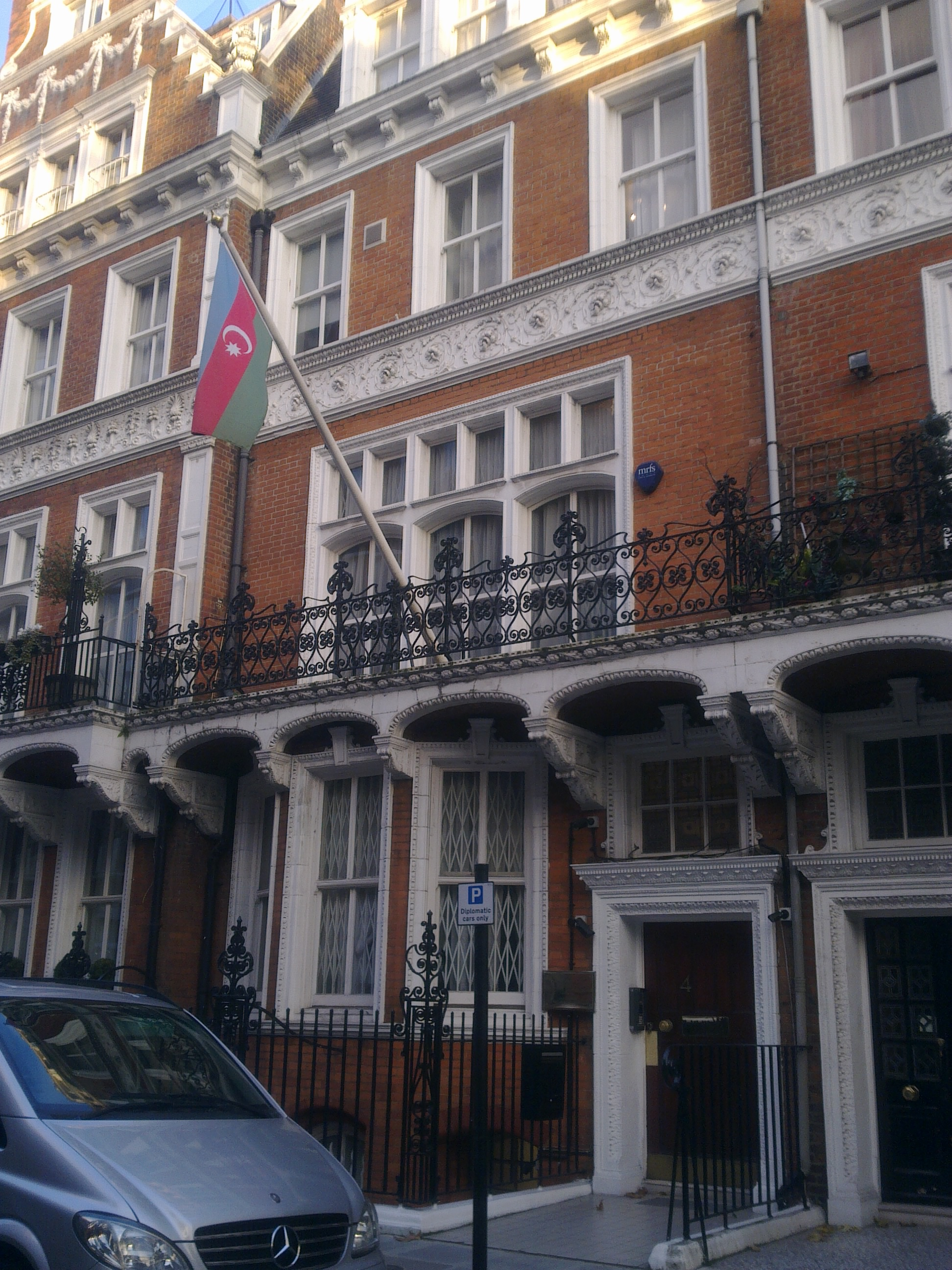
Embassy in London

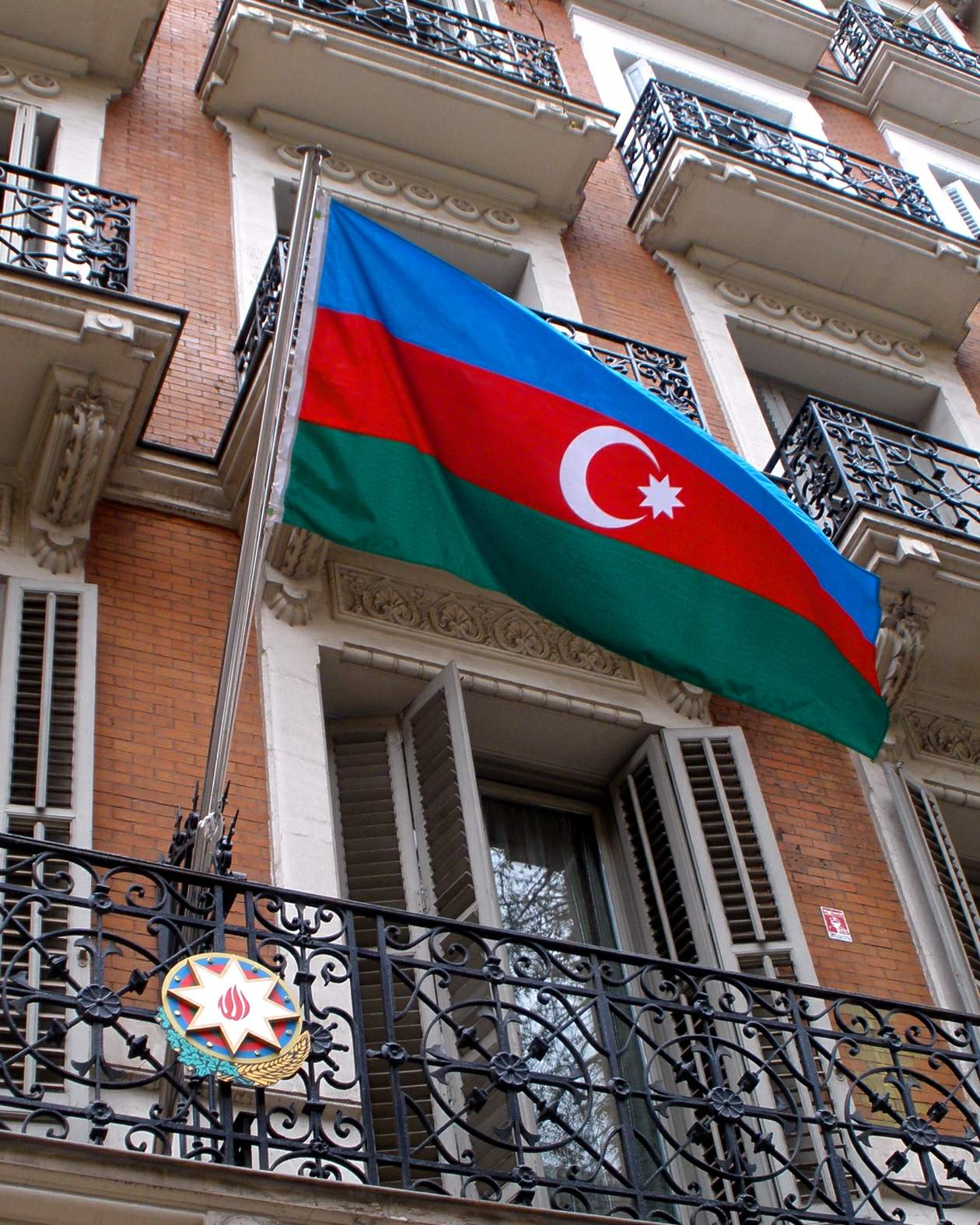
Embassy in Madrid

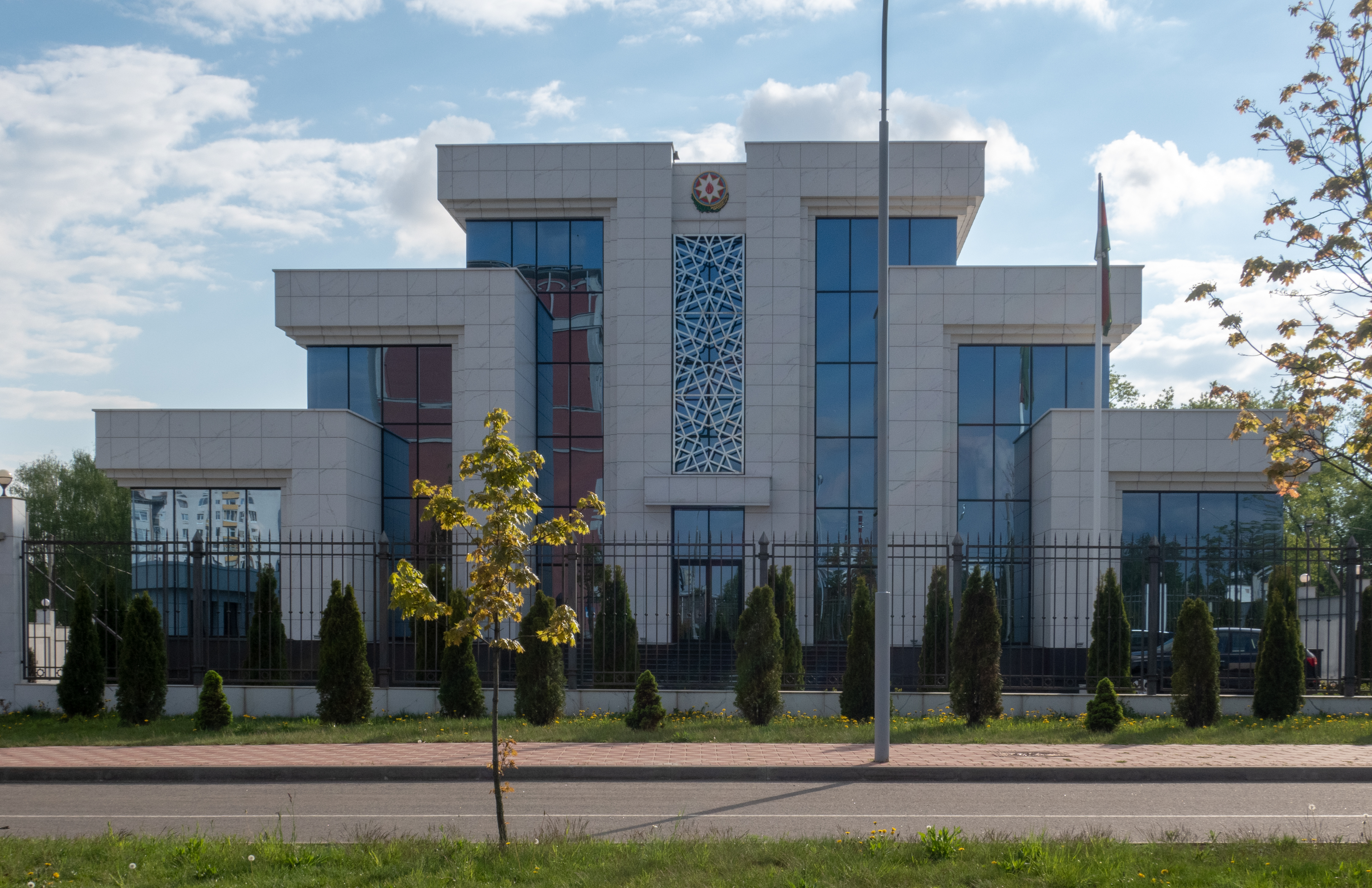
Embassy in Minsk

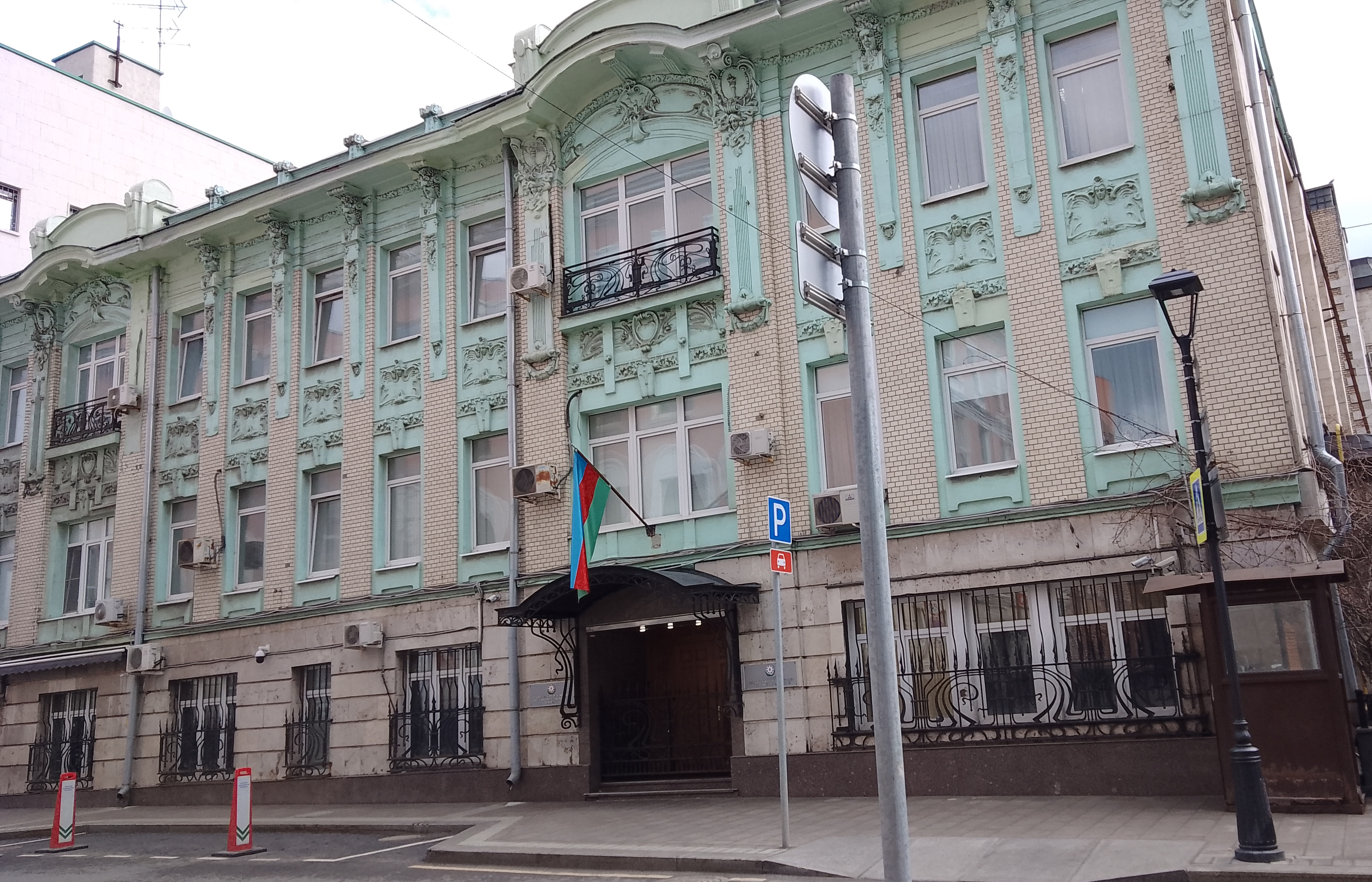
Embassy in Moscow

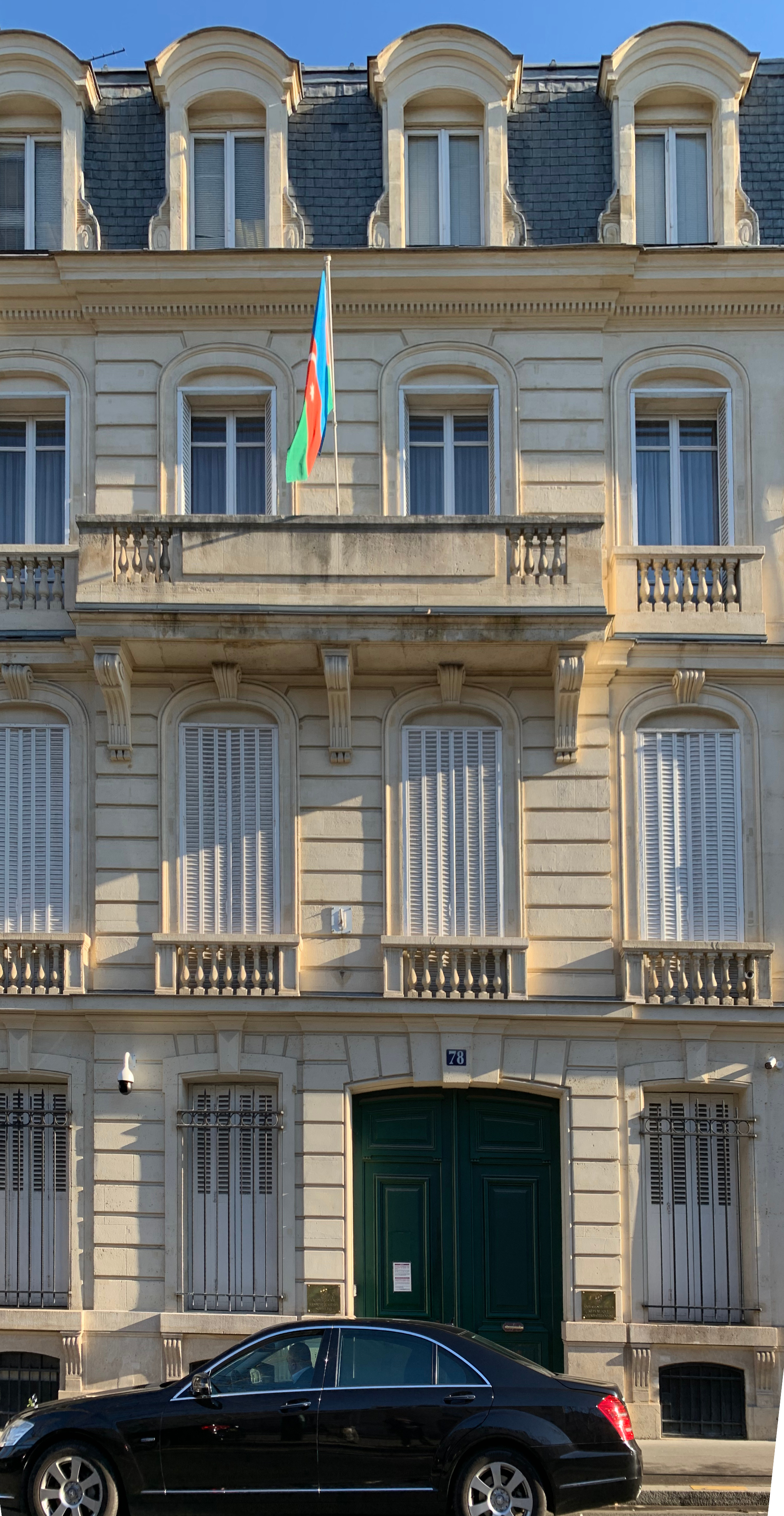
Embassy in Paris

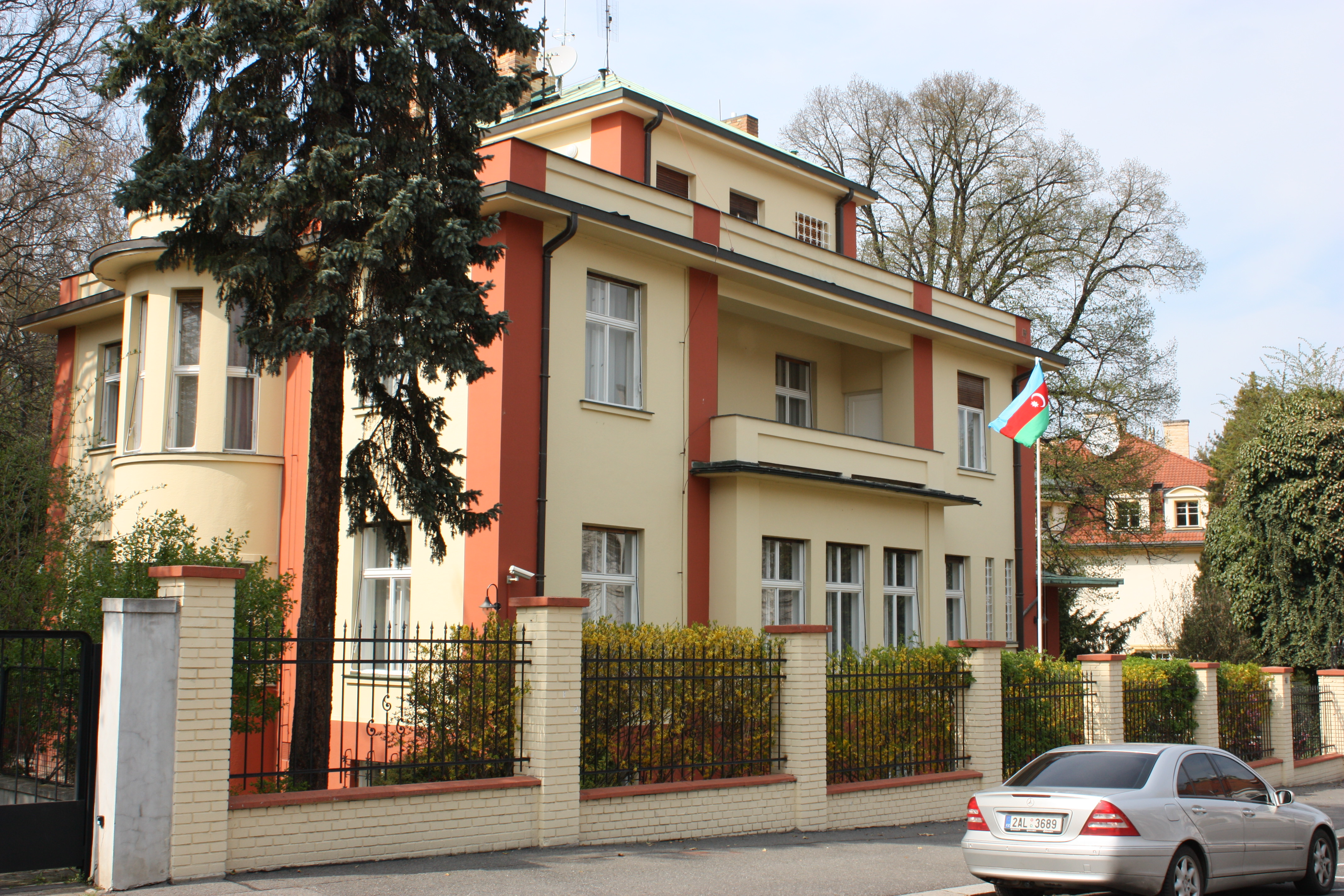
Embassy in Prague

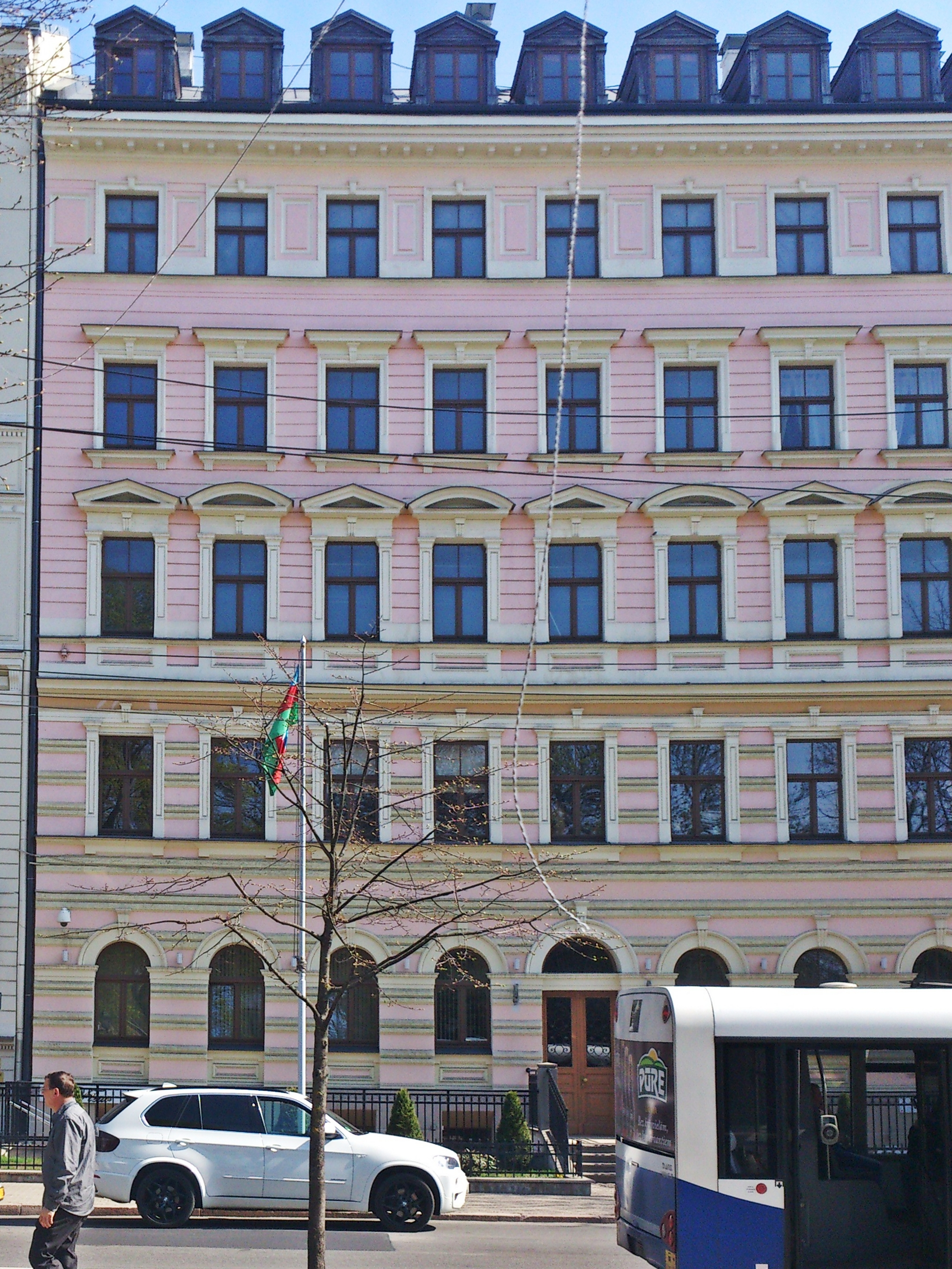
Embassy in Riga

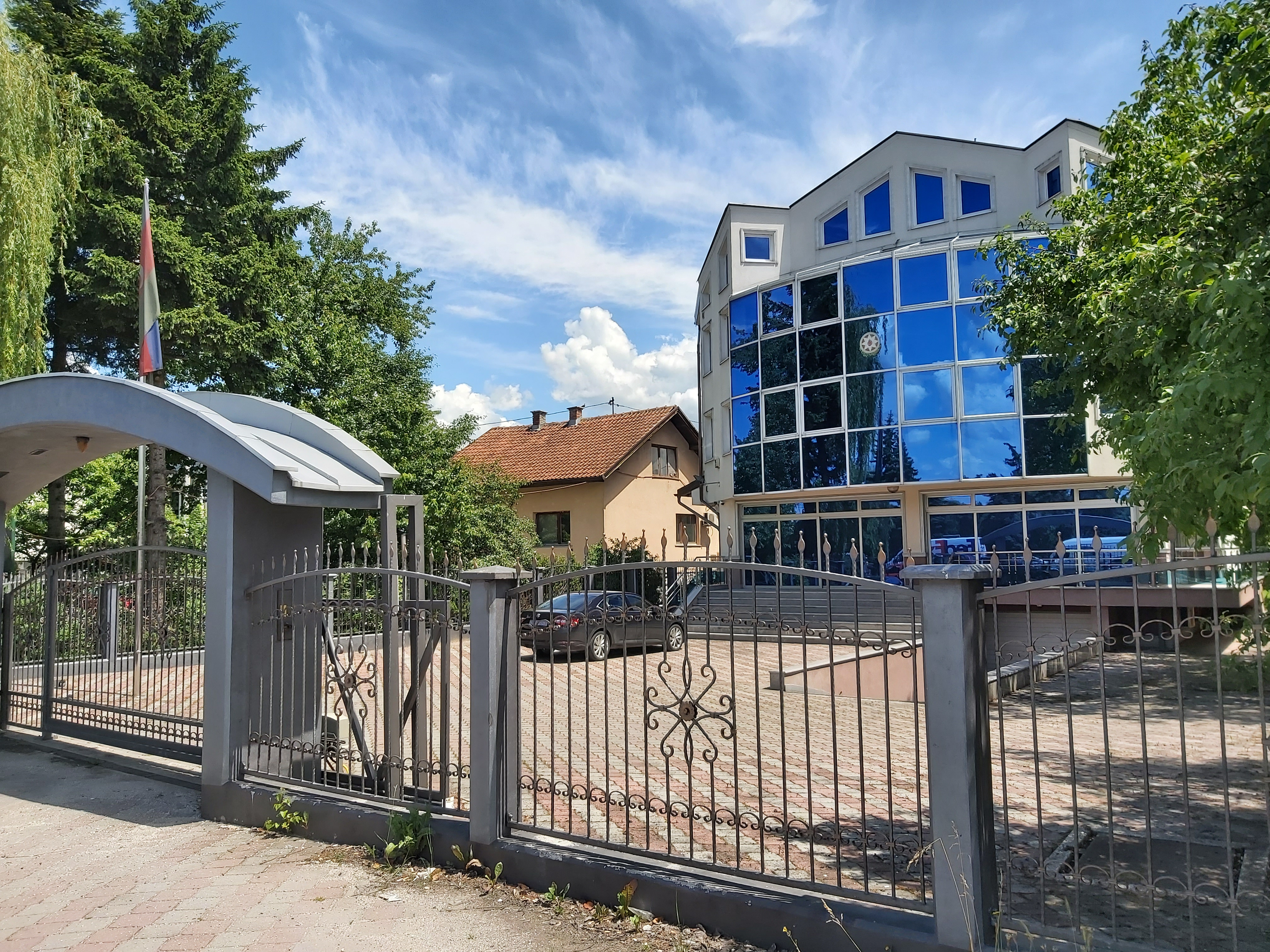
Embassy in Sarajevo

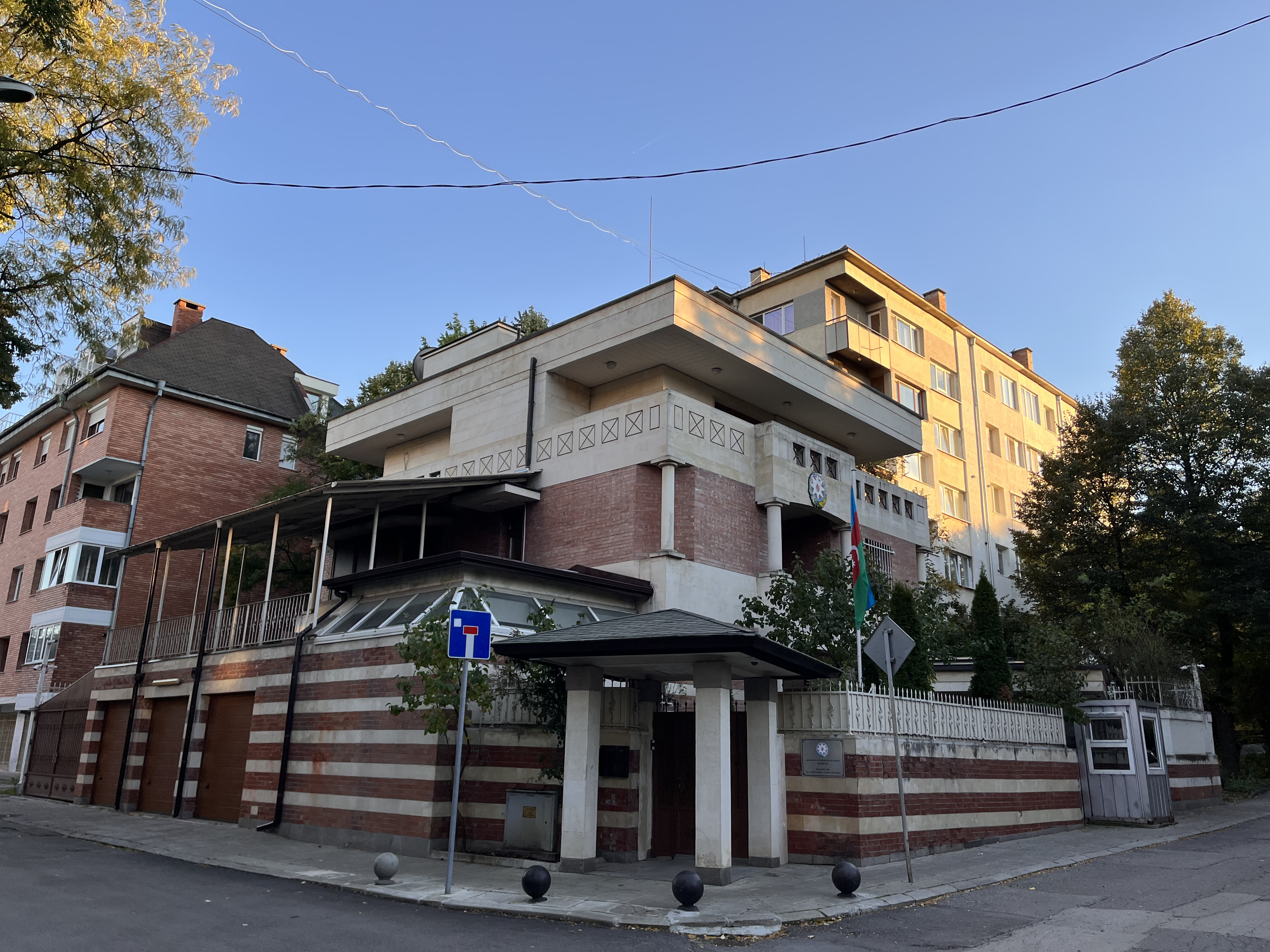
Embassy in Sofia

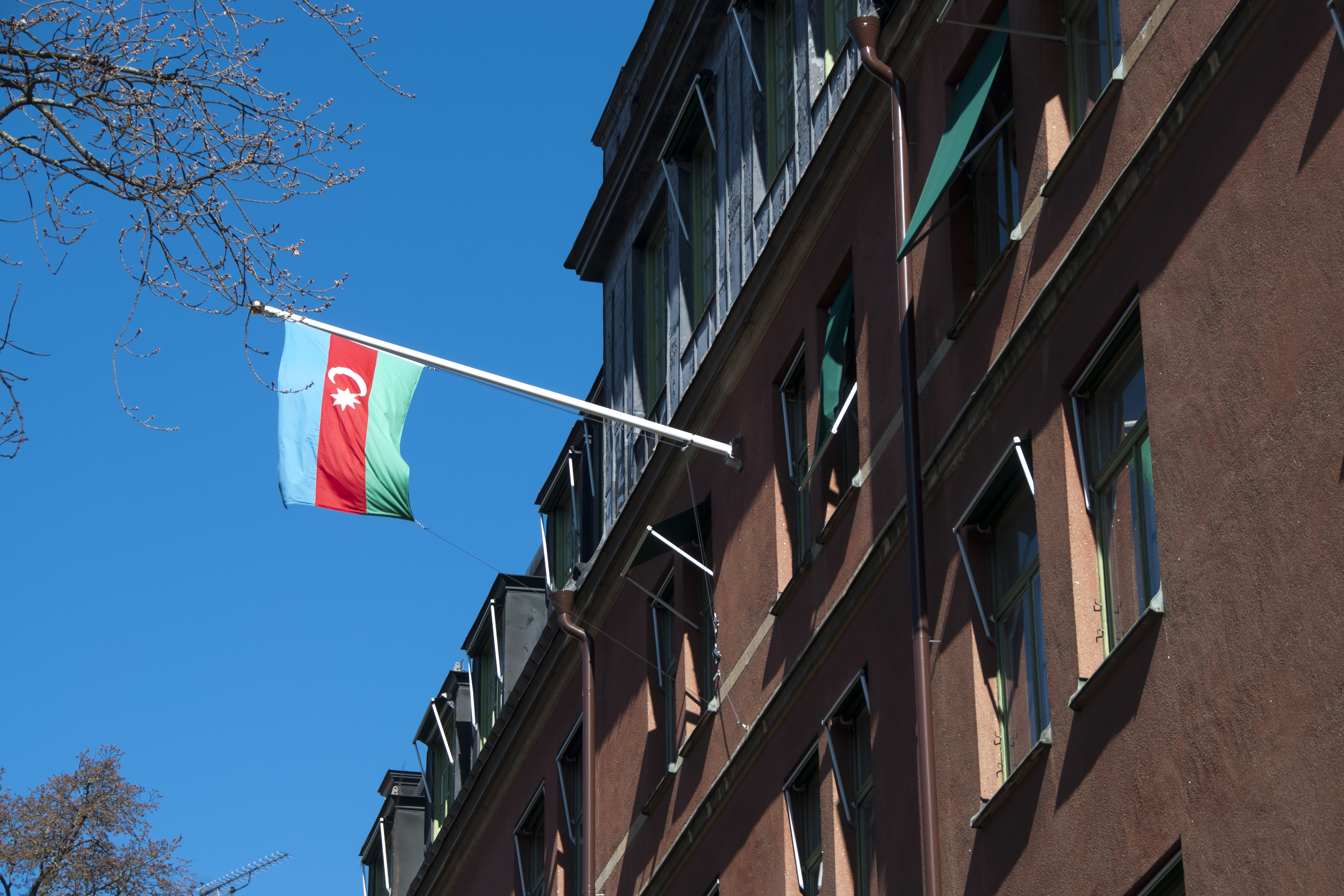
Embassy in Stockholm

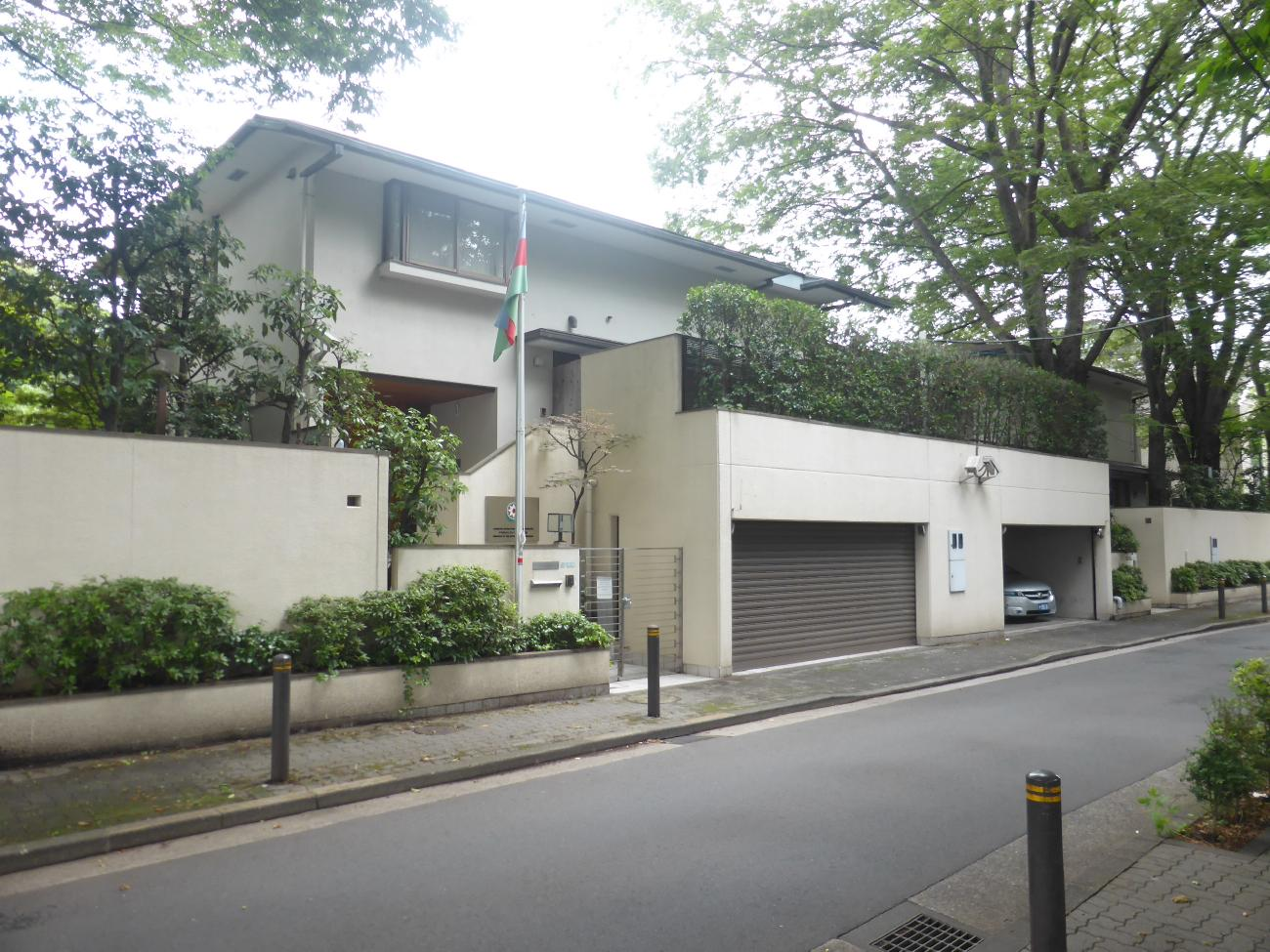
Embassy in Tokyo

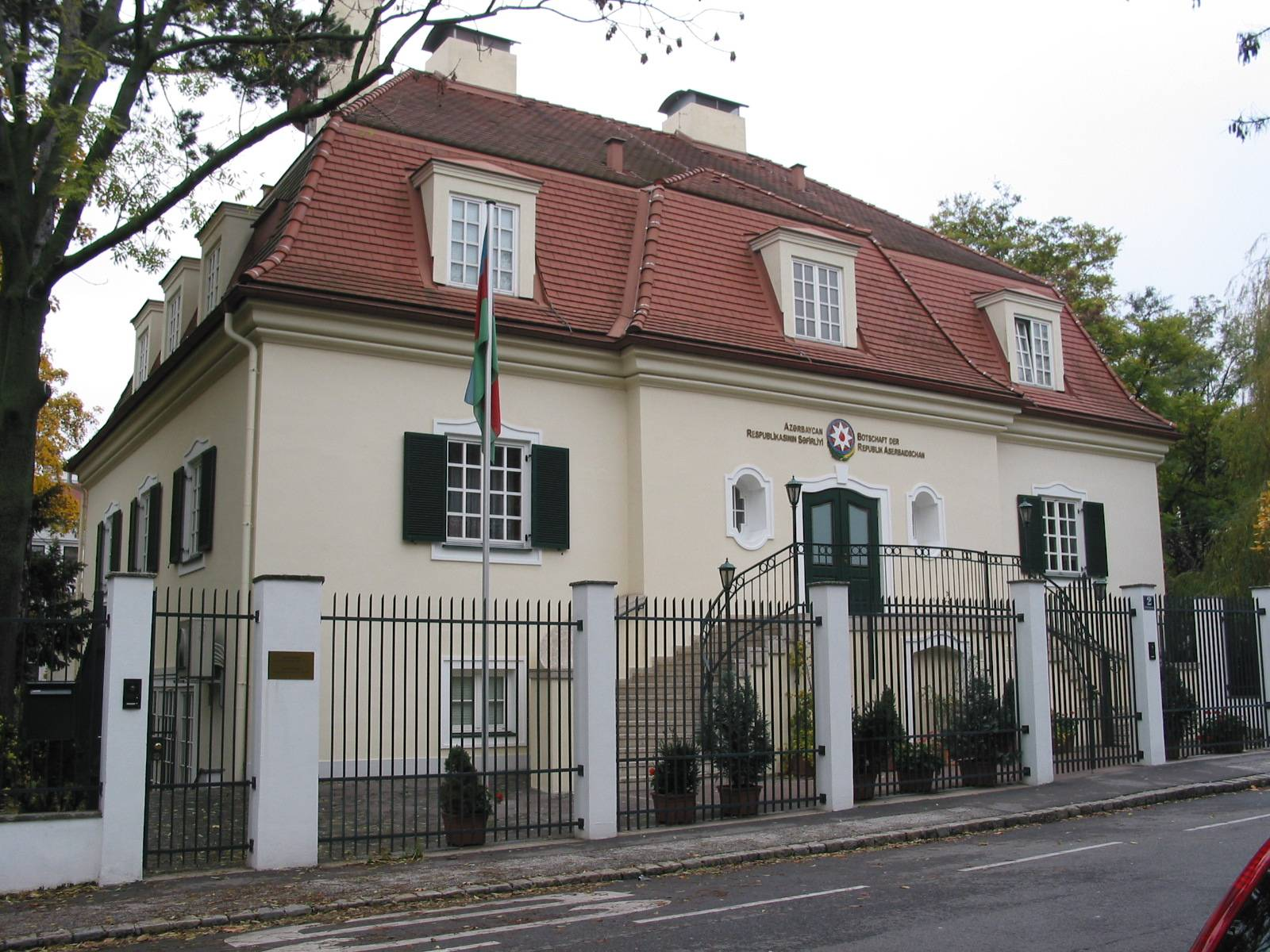
Embassy in Vienna

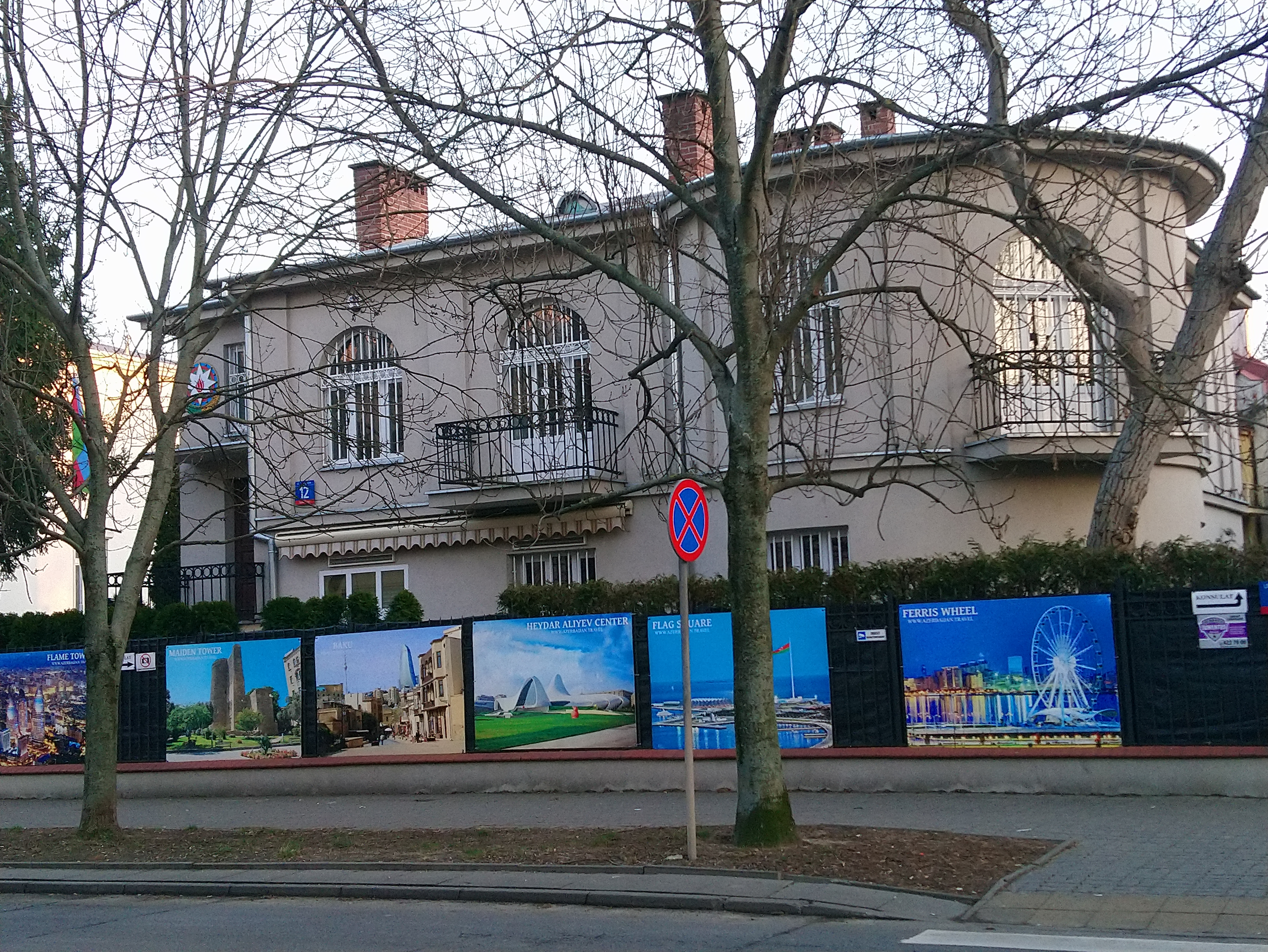
Embassy in Warsaw

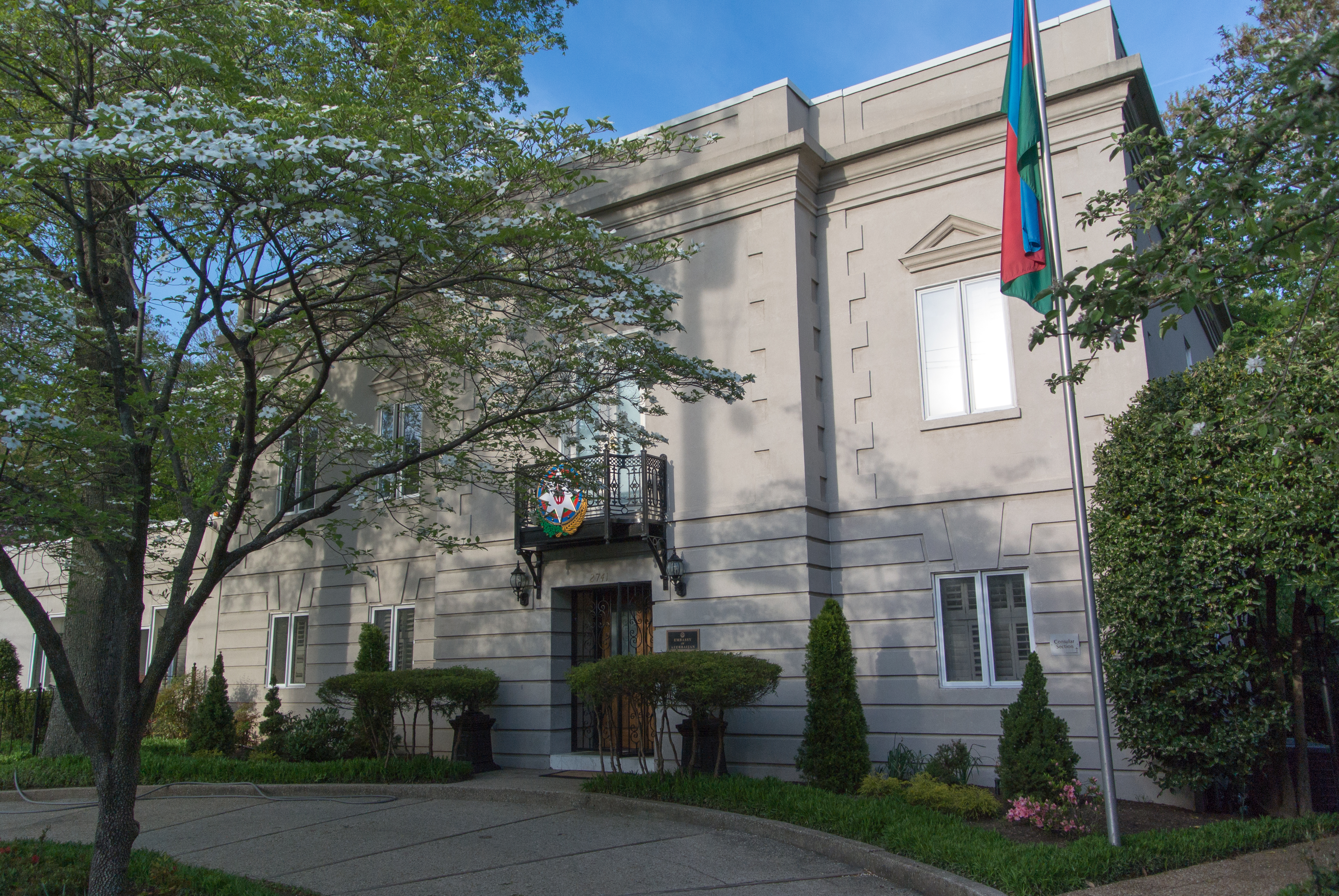
Embassy in Washington, D.C.

== Closed missions ==
=== Africa ===
Host country	Host city	Mission	Year closed	Ref.
Libya	Tripoli	Embassy (Note: To be reopened.)	2014	

=== Europe ===
Host country	Host city	Mission	Year closed	Ref.
Slovenia	Ljubljana	Embassy office (Note: Subordinate to the embassy in Vienna, Austria.)	Unknown	

== See also ==
- Foreign relations of Azerbaijan
- List of diplomatic missions in Azerbaijan
- Visa policy of Azerbaijan
