= Azerbaijan–Russia relations =

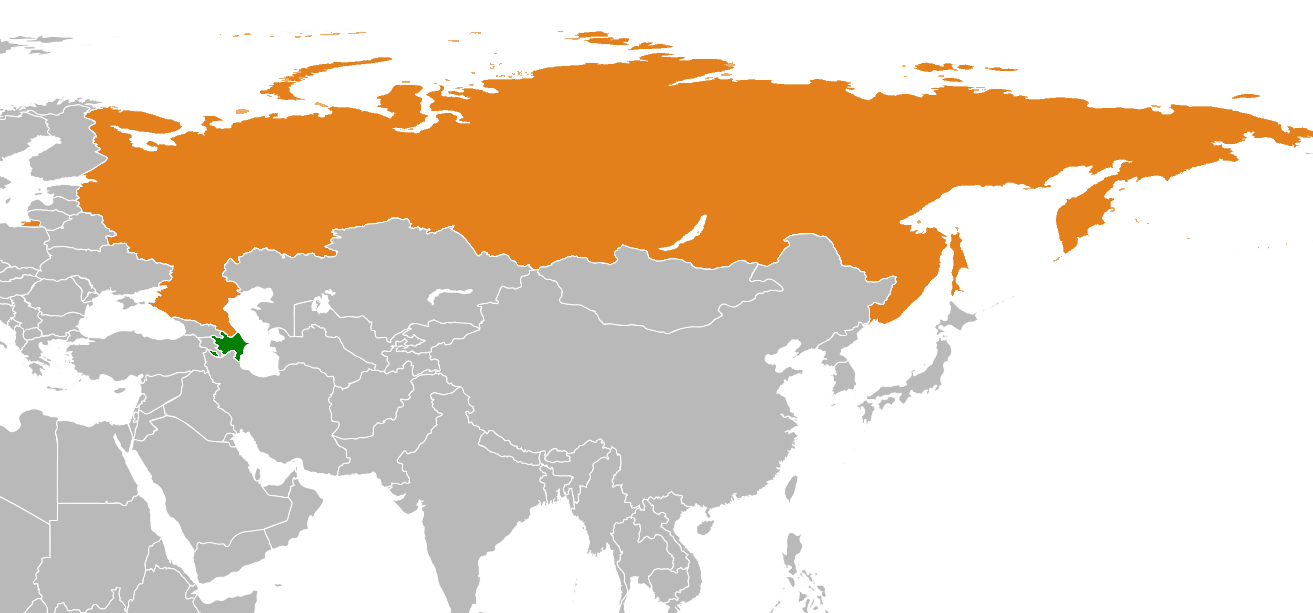

- Azerbaijan: Russia

Diplomatic mission
- Embassy of Azerbaijan, Moscow: Embassy of Russia, Baku

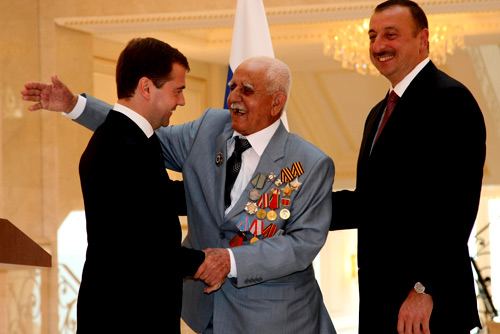
Dmitry Medvedev is greeted by Azerbaijani Great Patriotic War veteran Agadadash Samedov and President of Azerbaijan Ilham Aliyev in Baku

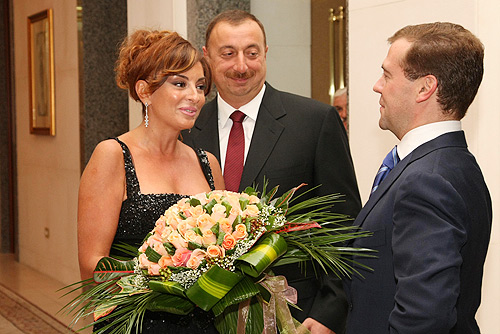
Dmitry Medvedev is greeted by President of Azerbaijan Ilham Aliyev and his wife Mehriban Aliyeva

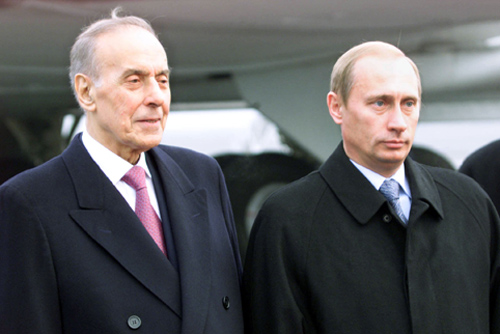
Vladimir Putin with Heydar Aliyev in Azerbaijan at Bina airport on 9 January 2001

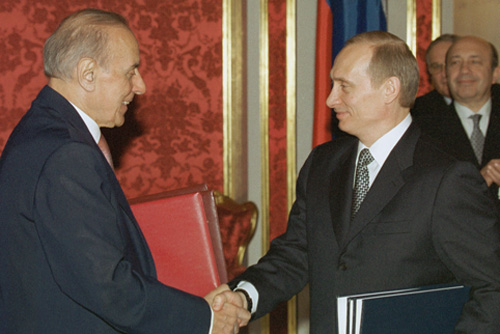
President Putin with President Heydar Aliyev of Azerbaijan during a ceremony for signing Russian-Azerbaijani documents.

Russia and Azerbaijan are de facto and de jure allies in many different aspects, including military. Bilateral relations exist between the Republic of Azerbaijan and the Russian Federation.

== History ==
What is now Azerbaijan became part of the Russian Empire after Qajar Iran was forced to cede it alongside all of its other Caucasian territories following the Russo-Persian War (1804–13) and the resulting Treaty of Gulistan and the Russo-Persian War (1826–28) and the subsequent Treaty of Turkmenchay. The area north of the Aras River, including the territory of the present-day Republic of Azerbaijan, had been Iranian territory until it was occupied by Russia. After decades as a territory of the Russian Empire, Azerbaijan achieved independence, before subsequently being annexed into the Soviet Union in 1920.

=== Post-independence ===
After the collapse of the USSR in 1991, relations between the two countries grew closer due to Ayaz Mutallibov's foreign policy. However, after the Armenian occupation of Khojaly, Mutallibov was forced to resign which resulted in Abulfaz Elchibey coming to power. During the one-year rule of Elchibey, Azerbaijan–Russia relations were damaged. Elchibay's politics have been described as "Anti-Russian." When Heydar Aliyev came to power in 1993, he reestablished warmer relations with Russia. According to President Ilham Aliyev, Vladimir Putin gave his father, Heydar Aliyev, a lasting impression, particularly in their shared KGB background.

=== Russia's weapons transfers to Armenia in 2008 ===
At the beginning of 2009, Azerbaijani media published allegations that Russia had made extensive weapons transfers to Armenia throughout 2008 costing about $800 million. On 12 January 2009, the Russian ambassador was invited to the Azerbaijani Ministry of Foreign Affairs and asked about this information. On 21 January 2009, the Russian ministry of foreign relations officially denied the transfers. According to the materials published by WikiLeaks in December 2010, Azerbaijani defense minister Safar Abiyev claimed that in January 2009, during his visit to Moscow, his Russian counterpart Anatoliy Serdyukov had unofficially admitted to the weapon transfers although it was officially denied.

=== Breakdown and renewal ===
A series of breakdowns in relations occurred throughout the 2010s, including the failed renewal of the lease of the Gabala Radar Station to Russia in December 2012, the consequent construction of a new Voronezh radar station, the Armavir Radar Station, in Russia's own Krasnodar Region, the decision by Russia to stop the transit of Azeri oil via the Baku–Novorossiysk pipeline, and the holding of the Azerbaijani tanker "Naphthalene" in Dagestan on suspicion of hauling contraband. Azerbaijan and Russia held discussions on the issues of Nagorno-Karabakh, the Caspian Sea, and cooperation in energy. Additionally, an agreement on cooperation and terms for oil supply was signed by the State Oil Company of Azerbaijan Republic (SOCAR) and Rosneft, and there was also an agreement on the construction of a new automobile bridge across the Samur River, on the Azerbaijani-Russian border. The visit took on added importance as it was read as leveraging Armenia–Azerbaijan relations in a warning in light of Armenia considering signing an Association Agreement with the European Union.

Russia expressed reluctance to intervene against Azerbaijan during the Second Nagorno-Karabakh War, despite its formal alliance with Armenia. This was attributed to deteriorating Armenia-Russia relations following the 2018 Armenian revolution, as well as growing Russian ties with Azerbaijan. Russia facilitated peace talks between Azerbaijan and Armenia, culminating in a ceasefire on 10 October, though this was later disregarded by both sides.

While relations between the Azerbaijani government and Russia tend to be tepid, many Azerbaijani opposition leaders had condemned Russia for its invasion of Ukraine that began in February 2022. Ukraine had accused Azerbaijan of evading sanctions against Russia.

Russia has supported the Azerbaijani Zangezur corridor plan, with a role for Russia as the guarantor of it, despite vocal opposition from Armenia and Iran.

== Modern relations ==
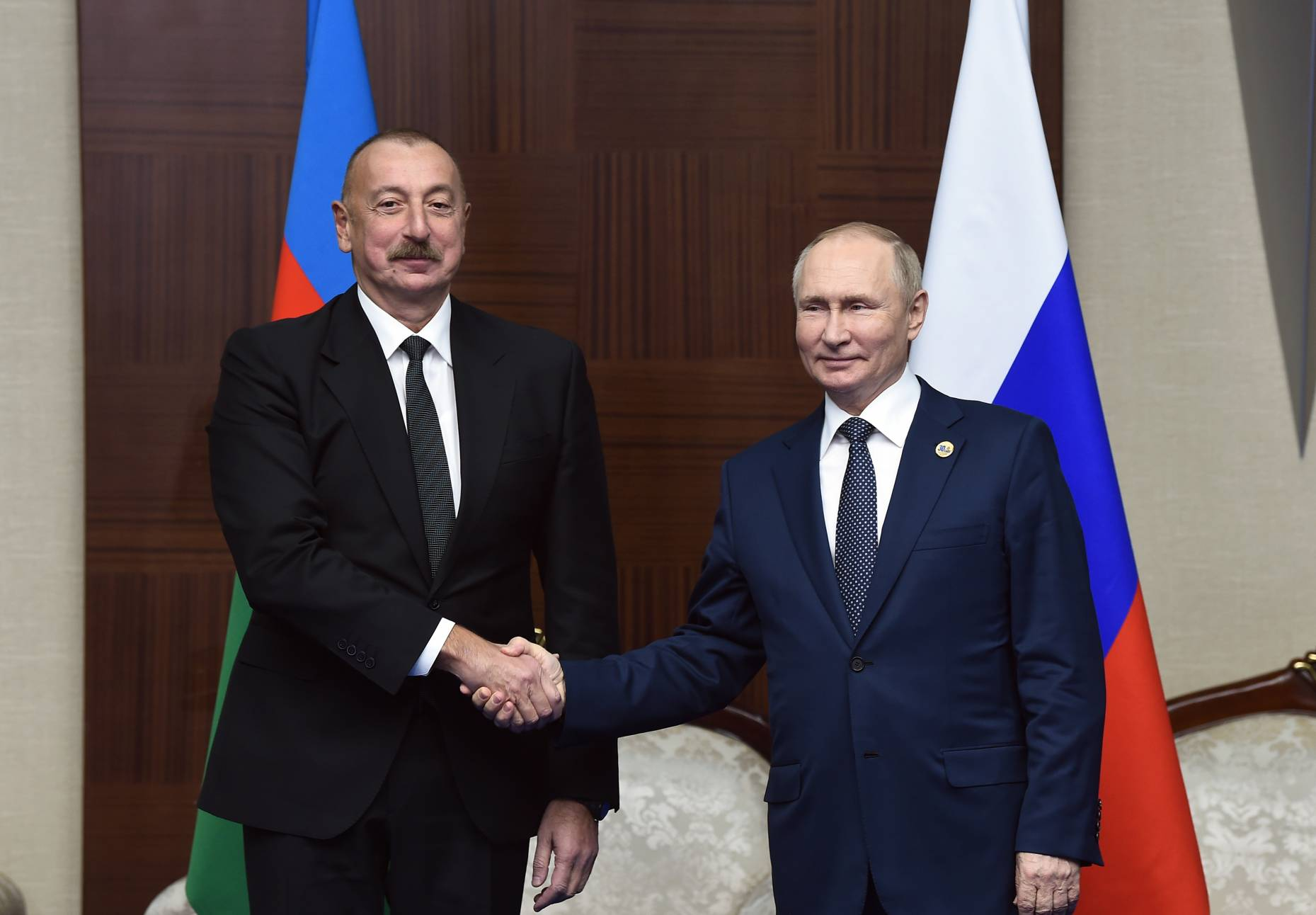
Azerbaijani President Ilham Aliyev meeting with Russian President Vladimir Putin on 13 October 2022

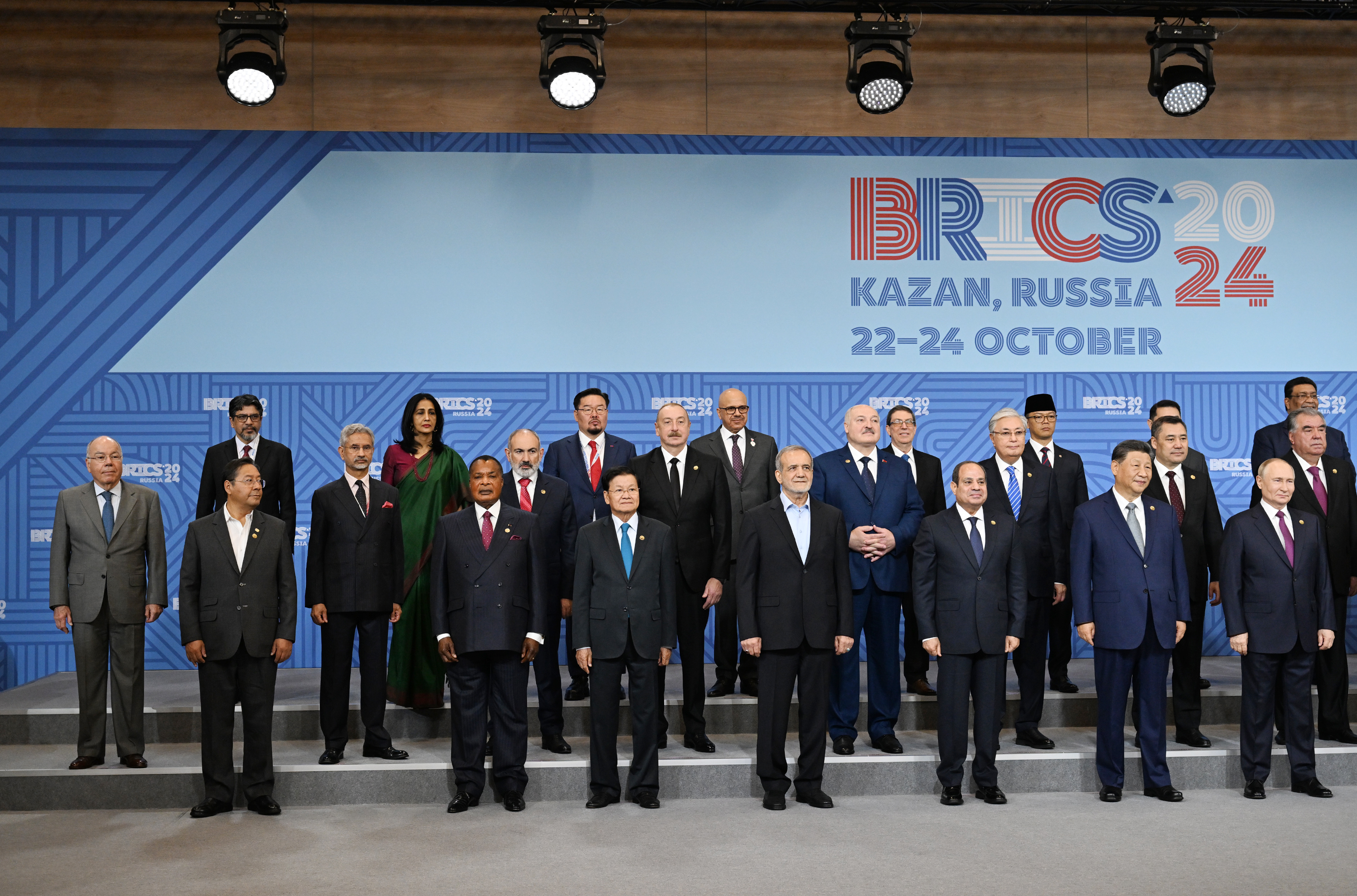
Vladimir Putin with Ilham Aliyev and other leaders at the 16th BRICS summit in Kazan, Russia, 24 October 2024

Russia has an embassy in Baku, and Azerbaijan has an embassy in Moscow and consulate-general in Saint Petersburg. Azerbaijan also announced that it will open another consulate-general in Yekaterinburg. There are more than half a million Azeris in Russia as well as a notable diaspora of Russians in Azerbaijan, which is the largest Russian diaspora in the region. President of Russia Dmitry Medvedev stated that the peoples of Russia and Azerbaijan were tied with "closest friendship and trust links". Relations between the two countries remain friendly and close but there are numerous disagreements such as in the First Nagorno-Karabakh War, the South Ossetian-Abkhazian conflict, and the legal status of the Caspian Sea. Azerbaijan supported Russia on the Chechnya issue and closed the office of Chechen rebel president Aslan Maskhadov's representative in Baku, as they faced a possible separatist movement by Lezghins (Lezgistan). Some analysts argued that Russia was neutral and somewhat supported Azerbaijan in the Karabakh conflict in the beginning of the 1990s until Elchibey's nationalist government took office, which caused Russia to sign many military agreements with Armenia. These actions, along with the memory of Black January in 1990 during the dissolution of the Soviet Union, are sources of distrust of Russia in Azerbaijani society, mainly among nationalists. According to a poll taken in 2007, about of 80% of Azeris approved of the friendship with Russia. After the 2008 war with Georgia, this number dropped to 52%. Russophobia had never been common in Azerbaijan and the government is also strongly committed to protecting the rights of ethnic Russians in Azerbaijan, but hostility exists toward Russians who are married to or otherwise connected with Armenians. Azeris often face discrimination in Russia because of the common "Caucasophobia" that arose after the Chechen Wars, as it is believed Russians cannot differentiate between Azerbaijanis and other Caucasian nationalities.

=== Diplomatic crisis ===
An Azerbaijan Airlines Embraer 190 jet, Azerbaijan Airlines Flight 8243, crashed near Aktau, Kazakhstan, on 25 December 2024, killing 38 of 67 on board. The plane veered off course before crashing, but Aviation-security firm Osprey Flight Solutions suggested the aircraft was likely struck by a Russian air-defense system amid heightened tensions following drone strikes in southern Russia, though Russia cited a bird strike. Azerbaijan declared 26 December 2024, a national day of mourning, with condolences from President Ilham Aliyev. Officials in Azerbaijan have blamed Russia for denying the aircraft landing permissions in Russia, and alleged that the Russians hoped that the plane will crash in the Caspian Sea so evidence would be lost. President Aliyev criticised Moscow for their alleged coverup, and maintained that the aircraft was shot down by Russia unintentionally. He acknowledged Putin's apology over the incident, but demanded that Russia admits its responsibility over the crash, and offer compensation and punish those involved in the crash.

On 9 May 2025, the 80th anniversary of the Soviet victory over Nazi Germany, Azerbaijani President Ilham Aliyev pointedly skipped the Red Square Victory Day parade in Moscow, instead appearing in territories retaken from Armenia during the Second Nagorno-Karabakh War. His visit included ceremonial openings of infrastructure projects, signaling a premeditated shift in focus away from Moscow. Subsequent diplomatic fallout reignited a series of pointed media attacks on both sides. Russian outlets criticized Aliyev's perceived disloyalty, while Azerbaijani state-connected media accused Russia of historical ingratitude and political disrespect. Despite the sharp rhetoric, the two countries remain economically interconnected, especially through the Northern Corridor trade route. Russian officials, including some members of the Duma, have attempted to moderate the rhetoric, but fundamental disagreements, particularly regarding Nagorno-Karabakh and mutual strategic priorities in the Caucasus, continue to challenge the bilateral relationship. On 26 June 2025, Russia opened a criminal case against Aras Agalarov, a close associate of Ilham Aliyev.

On 29 June 2025, Azerbaijan's Ministry of Culture canceled all Russian-related cultural events nationwide in response to the deaths of two Azerbaijanis during a raid by Russian authorities in Yekaterinburg on 27 June. On 30 June 2025, Azerbaijan's authorities raided the branch of the Russian state media outlet Sputnik in Baku on suspicion of illegal financing despite the revocation of its operating license in Azerbaijan. Azerbaijani police detained two alleged FSB agents in Baku. On 1 July 2025, Azerbaijani authorities arrested eight more Russian nationals who appeared in court in Baku with obvious signs of beatings. Some of them were identified as IT professionals who fled to Azerbaijan after the announcement of the partial Russian mobilization in 2022. On 20 July, Azerbaijan announced it would file an international lawsuit against Russia over its involvement in the Aktau plane crash, following the deaths and previous disputes concerning the Aktau plane crash in December 2024. On 9 October 2025, Putin and Aliyev met for the first time in a year in Dushanbe, during which Putin admitted that the aircraft had been hit by a Russian surface-to-air missile, reiterated his apology and offered to pay compensation to Azerbaijan. Aliyev expressed gratitude at the statement.

== Military and security cooperation ==
Russia is one of Azerbaijan's main suppliers of arms. "As of today, military and technical cooperation with Russia is measured at $4 billion and it tends to grow further," President Ilham Aliyev said after meeting with Russian President Vladimir Putin in Baku in 2013. The leaders of the defense departments of both countries make guest visits on a regular basis. On 23–25 January 2006, Russian Minister of Defense Sergei Ivanov visited Baku, followed by Defense Minister Anatoly Serdyukov in November 2007.

On 25 January 2002, an agreement between Russia and Azerbaijan on the status, principles, and conditions for use of the Gabala Radar Station was signed, and on 28 November 2003, an intergovernmental protocol was signed. On 8 June 2007, at the G-8 summit in Heiligendamm, President Vladimir Putin made a proposal to use the Gabala Radar Station as a part of the U.S.-developed missile defense system. Gabala was suggested as an alternative to locations in Poland and the Czech Republic (both NATO members) as the US had planned, which Putin opposed despite US claims the system was not designed to counter a large-scale Russian missile attack, but rather that it was intended to defend against an attack from Iran or North Korea. The proposal to use Gabala was supported by the Azerbaijani leadership, which considered it a concrete contribution to stability and security in the region. The US, however, rejected the proposal as unsuitable.

== Economic relations ==
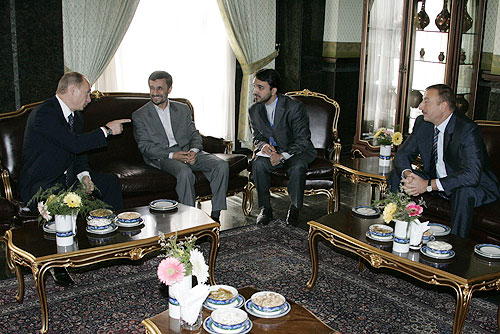
Vladimir Putin, Mahmoud Ahmedinejad and Ilham Aliyev.

Trade and economic cooperation between Russia and Azerbaijan is on the rise. In 2008, the trade turnover between the two countries increased annually by 39.3%, totalling US$2.403 billion, exports grew by 42.6% up to $1.9911 billion, and imports increased by 25.4% up to $411.4 million. Despite the end of Russian gas deliveries to Azerbaijan on 1 January 2007, Russian-Azerbaijani trade has kept a positive trend, and its structure has evolved towards an increasing share of non-primary goods.

== Cultural relations ==
Russian–Azerbaijani relations in culture and education are developing steadily. In December 2006, the two countries adopted a program of interstate cooperation in the humanitarian sphere for 2007–2009. 2005 was the "Year of Azerbaijan" in Russia and 2006 was the "Year of Russia" in Azerbaijan; the two countries held 110 special cultural events during these two years. In 2008, in Baku, a branch of Moscow State University was established. In the universities of Azerbaijan, over 15 thousand students are involved in Russian language education. In Azerbaijan, there are over 50 Russian-language newspapers and 10 Russian news agencies.

== Resident diplomatic missions ==
of Azerbaijan in Russia

- Moscow (Embassy)
- Saint Petersburg (Consulate-General)
- Yekaterinburg (Consulate-General)

of Russia in Azerbaijan

- Baku (Embassy)

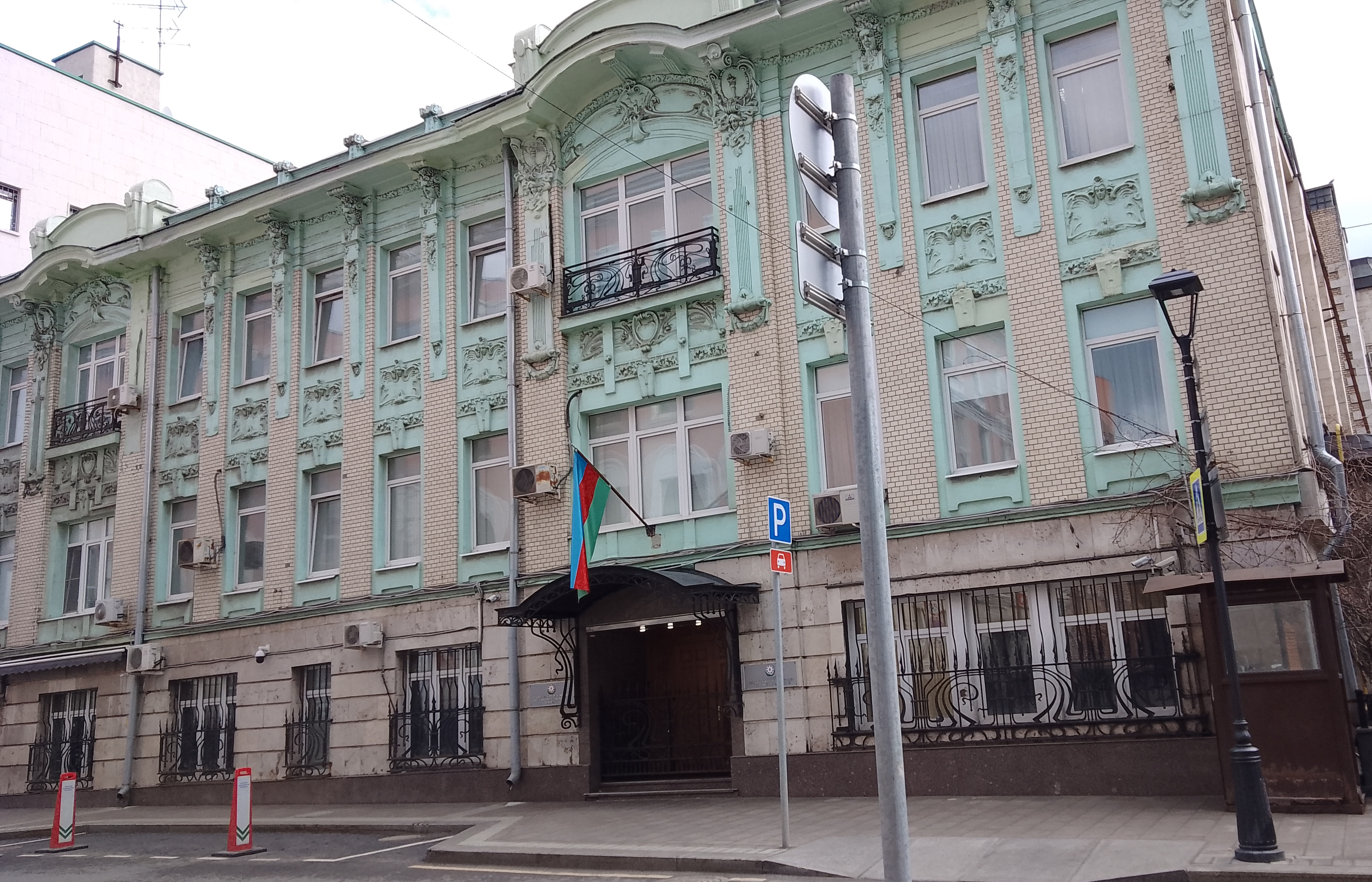
Embassy of Azerbaijan in Moscow

== See also ==
- Foreign relations of Azerbaijan
- Foreign relations of Russia
- Azerbaijan–Russia border
- Azerbaijanis in Russia
- Russians in Azerbaijan
- Armenia–Azerbaijan relations
- Armenia–Russia relations
- Russia–Turkey relations
