= List of diplomatic missions in Azerbaijan =

This is a list of diplomatic missions in Azerbaijan. At present, the capital city of Baku hosts over 65 embassies.

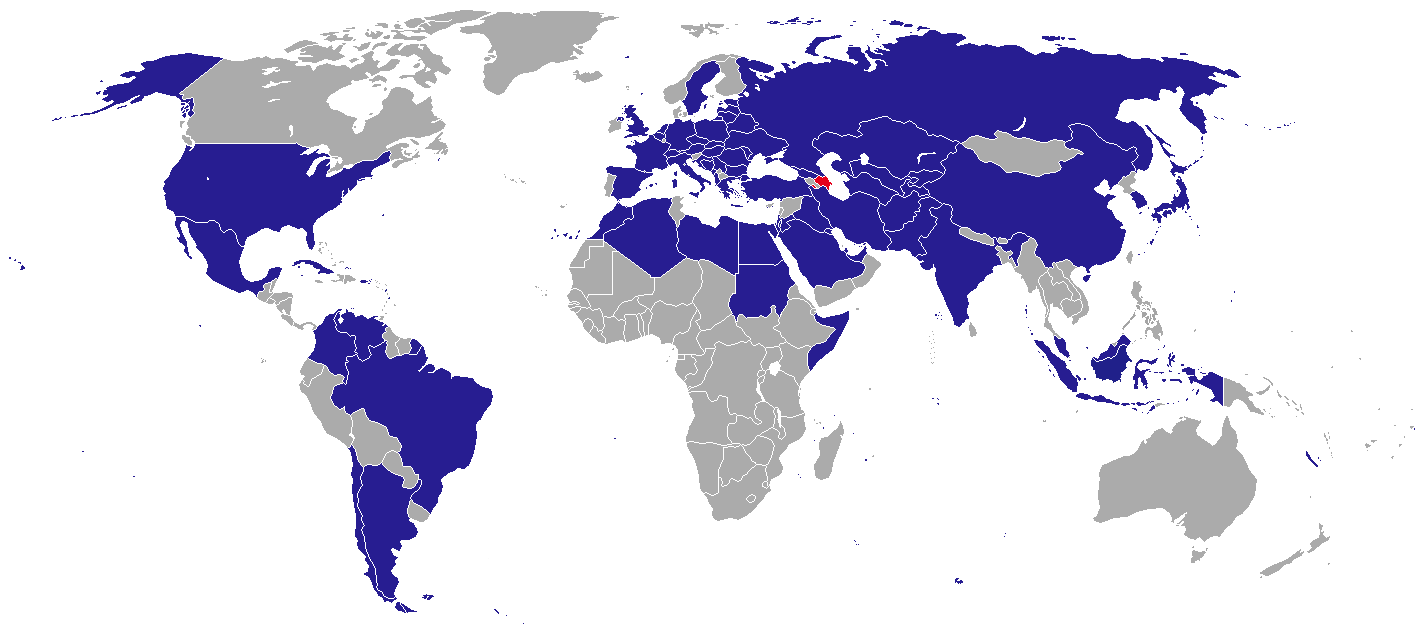
Map of diplomatic missions in Azerbaijan

== Diplomatic missions in Baku ==
=== Embassies ===
1. Afghanistan
2. Albania
3. Algeria
4. Argentina
5. Austria
6. Belarus
7. Belgium
8. Bosnia and Herzegovina
9. Brazil
10. Bulgaria
11. Chile
12. China
13. Colombia
14. Croatia
15. Cuba
16. Czech Republic
17. Egypt
18. Estonia
19. France
20. Georgia
21. Germany
22. Greece
23. Hungary
24. India
25. Indonesia
26. Iran
27. Iraq
28. Israel
29. Italy
30. Japan
31. Jordan
32. Kazakhstan
33. Kuwait
34. Kyrgyzstan
35. Latvia
36. Libya
37. Lithuania
38. Malaysia
39. Mexico
40. Moldova
41. Morocco
42. Netherlands
43. Pakistan
44. Palestine
45. Poland
46. Qatar
47. Romania
48. Russia
49. Saudi Arabia
50. Serbia
51. Slovakia
52. Somalia
53. South Korea
54. Sudan
55. Sweden
56. Switzerland
57. Tajikistan
58. Turkey
59. Turkmenistan
60. Ukraine
61. United Arab Emirates
62. United Kingdom
63. United States
64. Uzbekistan
65. Venezuela

=== Other missions/representative offices/delegations ===
1. European Union (Delegation)
2. Dagestan (Representative Office)
3. Montenegro (Embassy Office)
4. Northern Cyprus (Representative Office)
5. Portugal (Embassy office)
6. Spain (Embassy office)
7. Tatarstan (Representative Office)
8. United Nations (Resident Coordinator's Office)

== Gallery ==
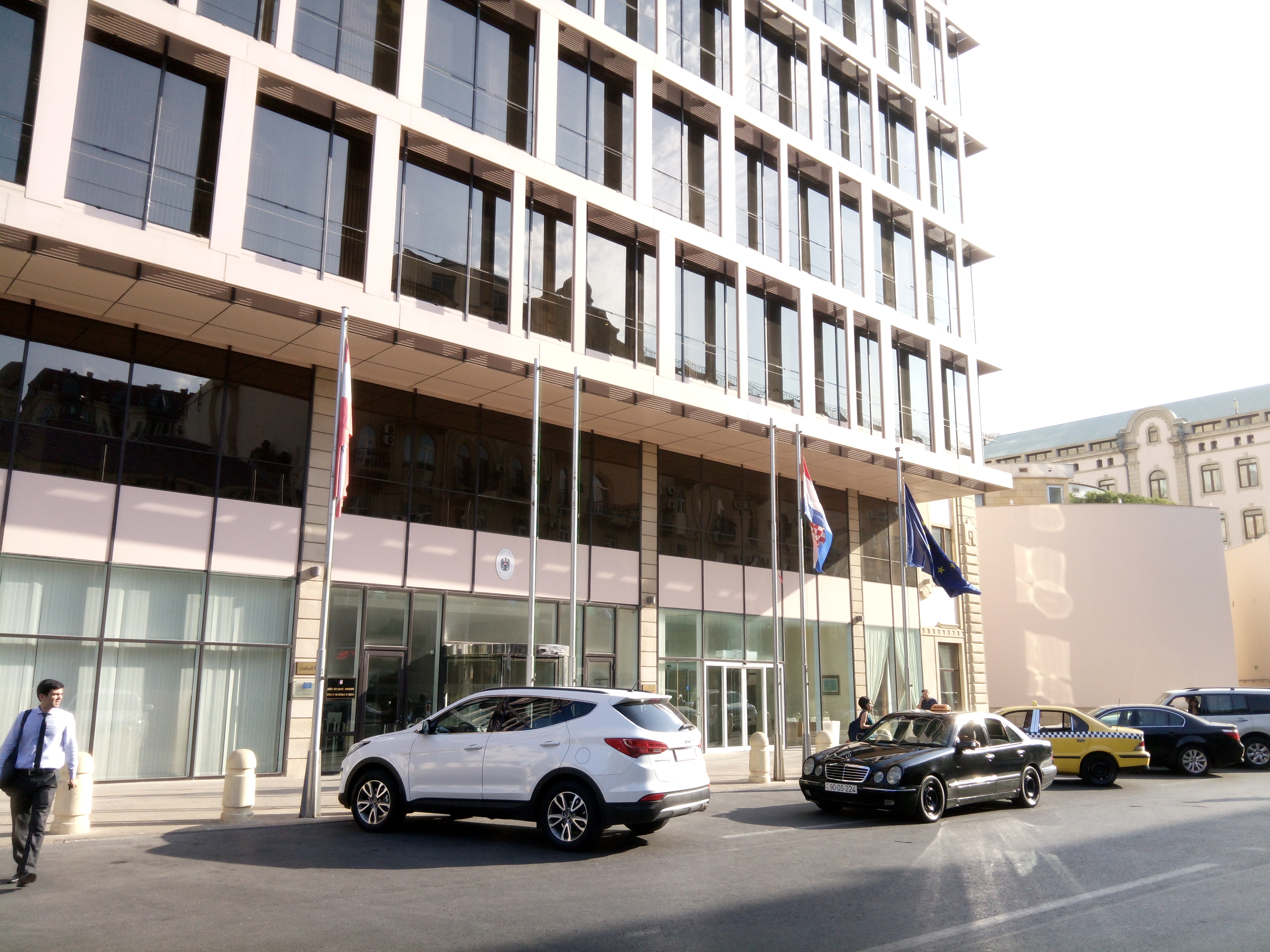
Embassies of Austria and Croatia

Building hosting the Embassies of Chile, Colombia and Mexico

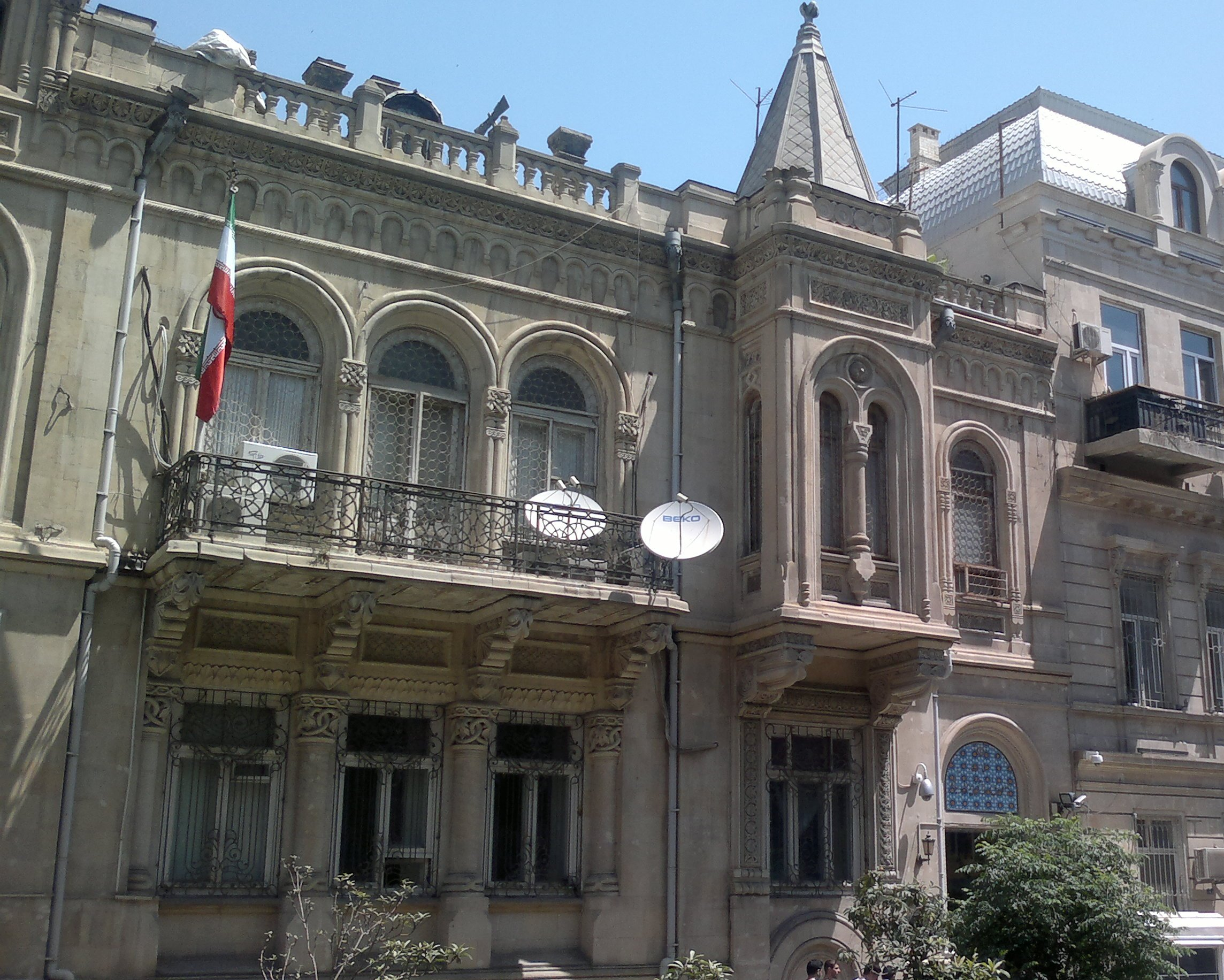
Embassy of Iran

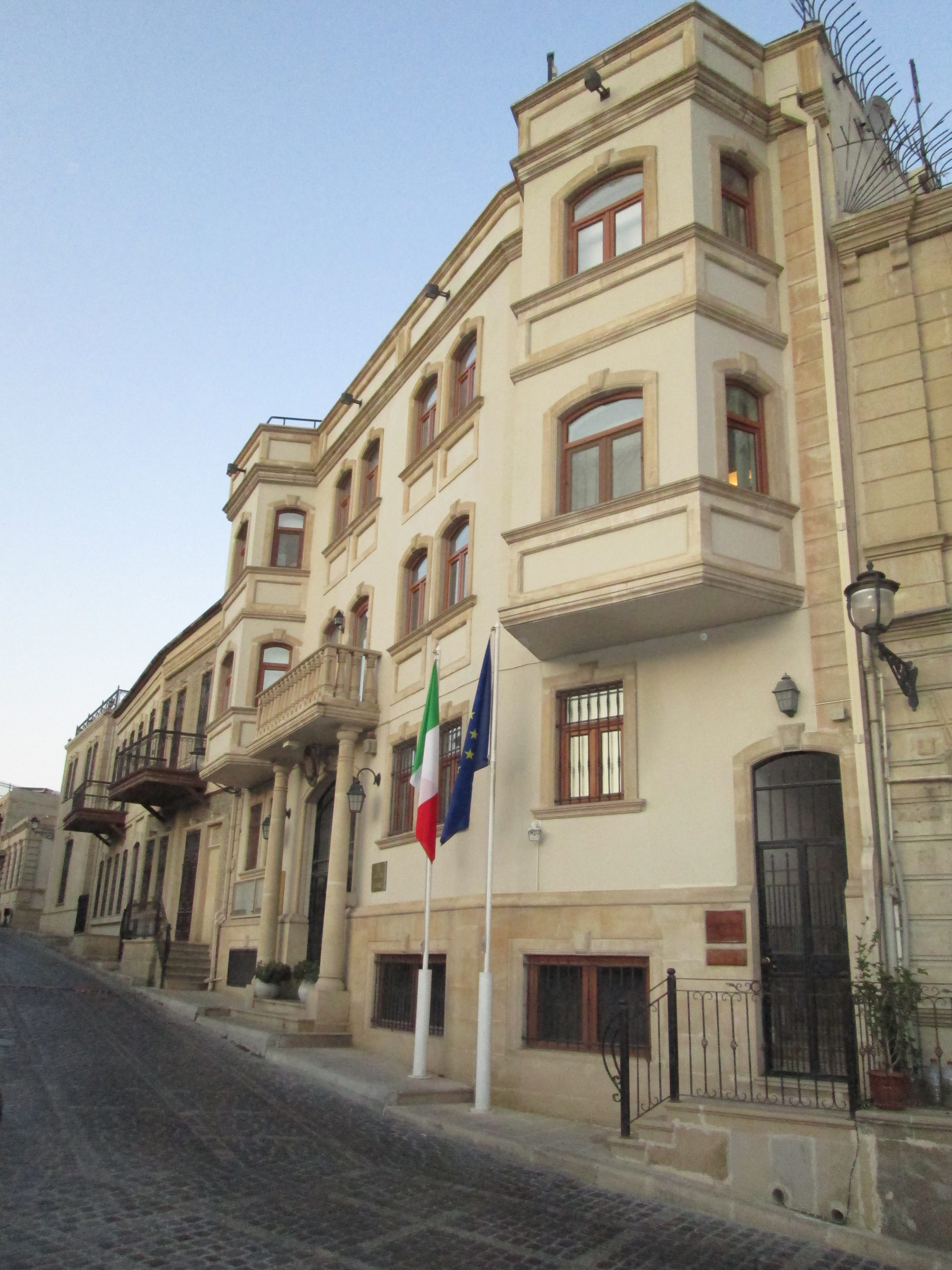
Embassy of Italy

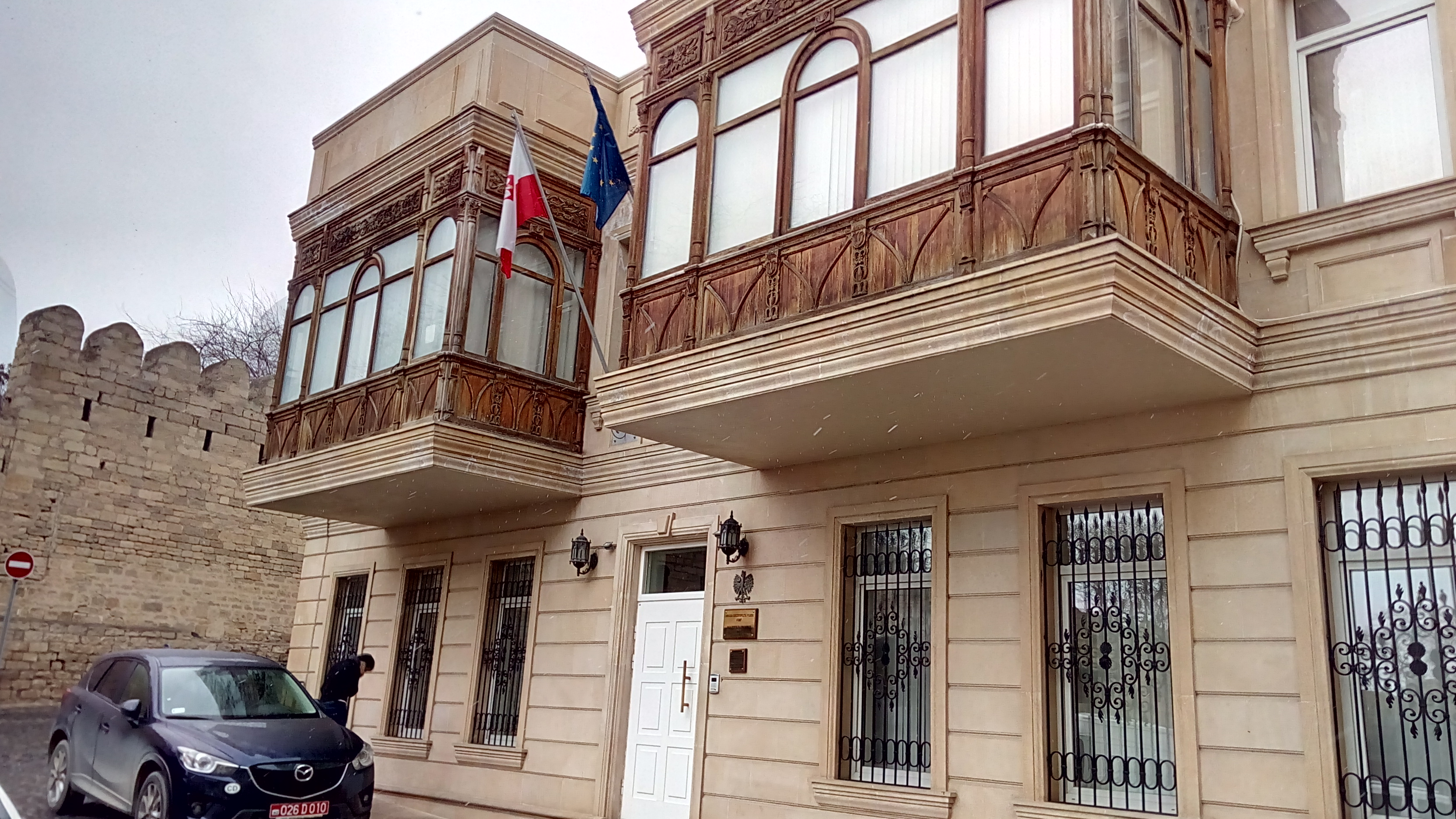
Embassy of Poland

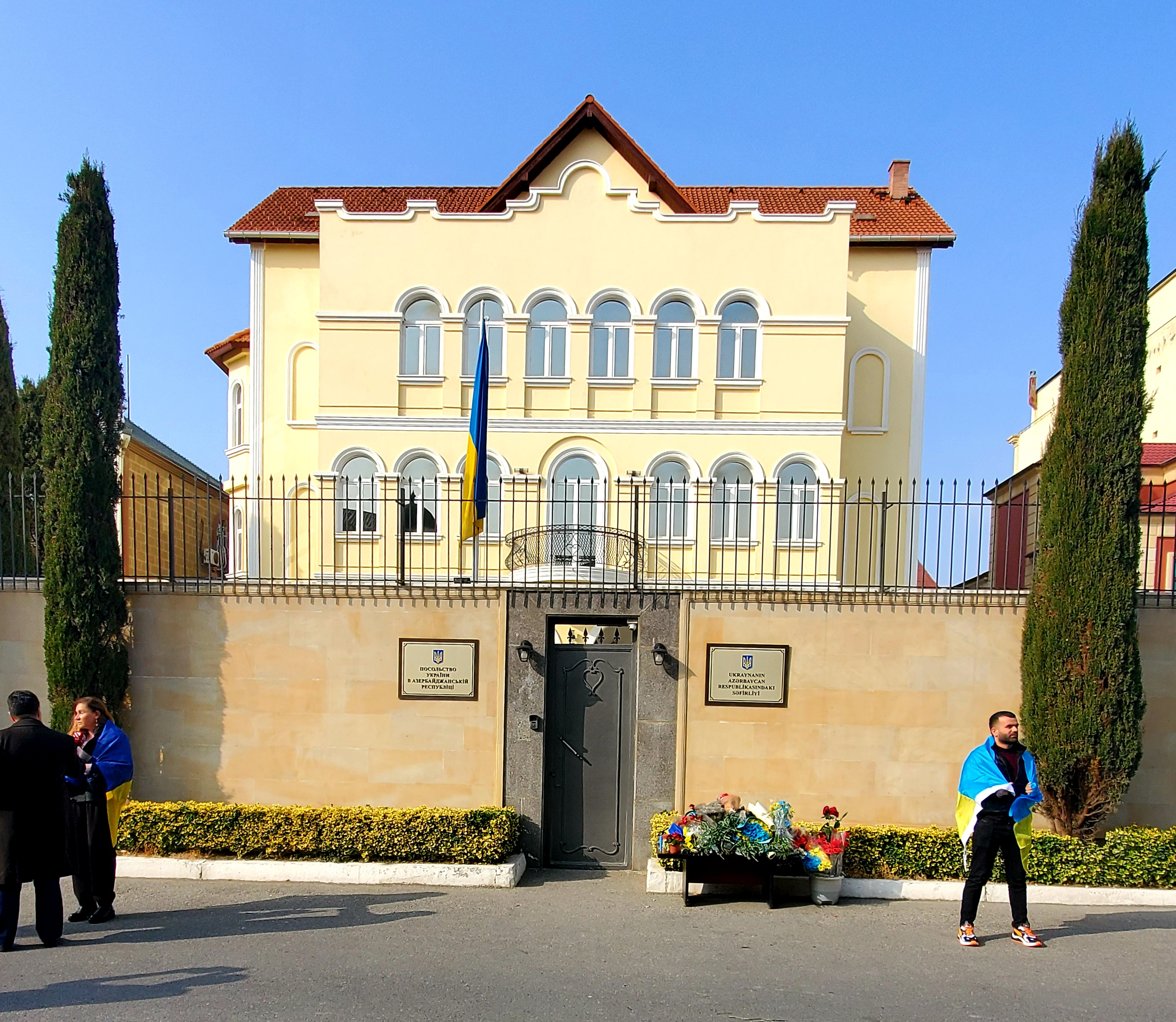
Embassy of Ukraine

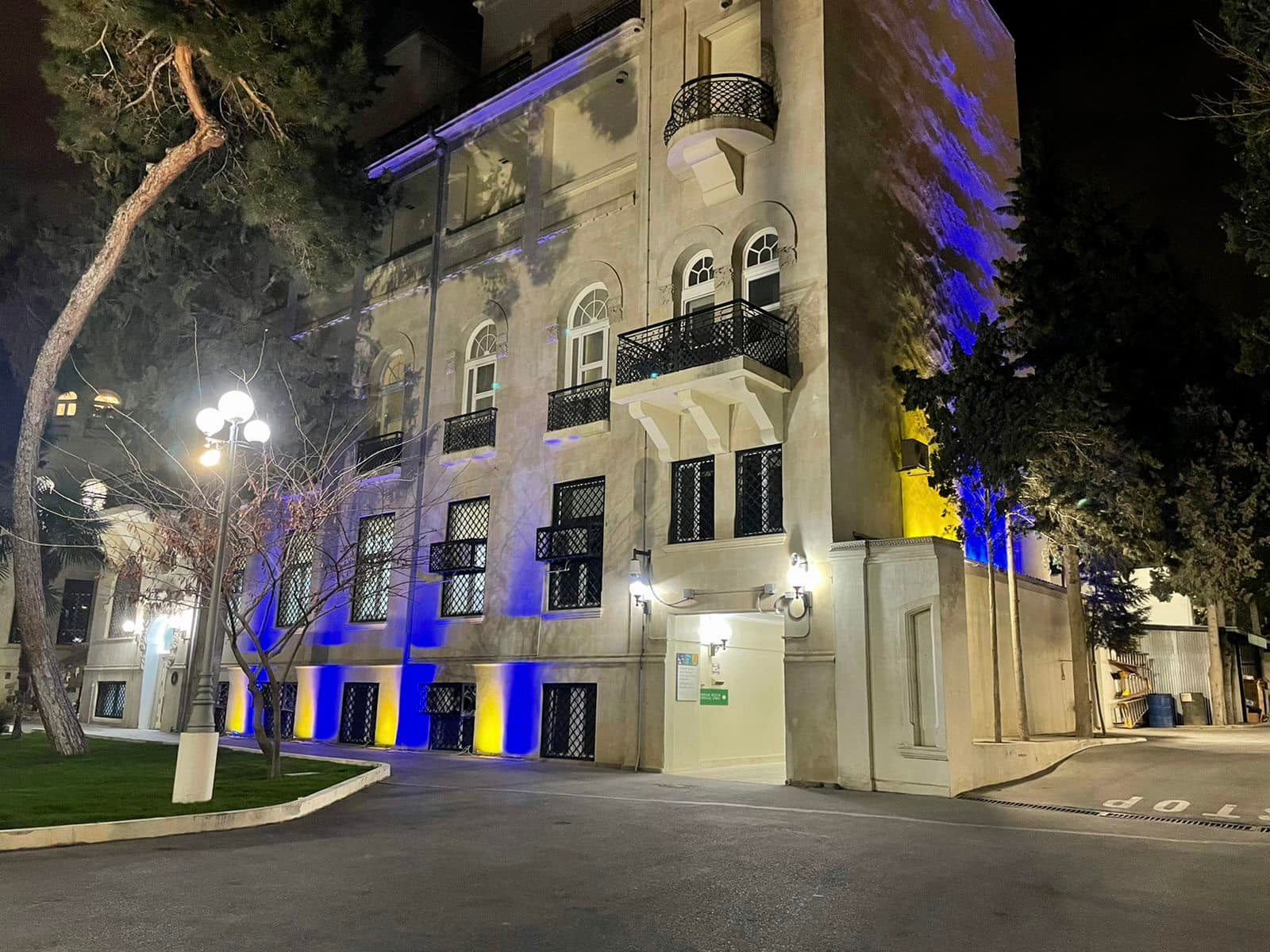
Embassy of the United States

== Consulates-General ==
=== Ganja ===
- Georgia
- Turkey

=== Nakhchivan ===
- Iran
- Turkey

== Non-resident embassies accredited to Azerbaijan ==
=== Resident in Ankara, Turkey ===
1. Australia
2. Bahrain
3. Bangladesh
4. Burkina Faso
5. Cambodia
6. Canada
7. Chad
8. Denmark
9. Dominican Republic
10. Ecuador
11. El Salvador
12. Estonia
13. Ethiopia
14. Gambia
15. Guatemala
16. Guinea
17. Guinea-Bissau
18. Holy See
19. Ireland
20. Maldives
21. Mauritania
22. Mongolia
23. Montenegro
24. New Zealand
25. North Macedonia
26. Norway
27. Oman
28. Panama
29. Paraguay
30. Peru
31. Philippines
32. Portugal
33. Rwanda
34. Senegal
35. Slovenia
36. South Africa
37. Spain
38. Tanzania
39. Thailand
40. Yemen
41. Zambia

=== Resident in Moscow, Russia ===
1. Angola
2. Benin
3. Burundi
4. Cameroon
5. Congo-Brazzaville
6. Congo-Kinshasa
7. Djibouti
8. Equatorial Guinea
9. Eritrea
10. Ghana
11. Laos
12. Mali
13. Mauritius
14. Myanmar
15. Namibia
16. Nepal
17. Nicaragua
18. Niger
19. North Korea
20. South Sudan
21. Uruguay
22. Vietnam
23. Zimbabwe

=== Resident in Tehran, Iran ===
1. Kenya
2. Ivory Coast
3. Lebanon
4. Nigeria
5. Sierra Leone
6. Sri Lanka
7. Uganda

=== Resident in other cities ===
1. Barbados (Havana)
2. Eswatini (Brussels)
3. Finland (Helsinki)
4. Guyana (Brasília)
5. Luxembourg (Luxembourg City)
6. Malawi (Doha)
7. Malta (Valletta)
8. Saint Vincent and the Grenadines (London)
9. San Marino (City of San Marino)
10. Seychelles (Abu Dhabi)

== Former embassies ==
- Costa Rica
- Peru

== Embassies to open ==
- Bosnia and Herzegovina
- Bangladesh
- Kenya
- Rwanda
- Zimbabwe

== See also ==
- Foreign relations of Azerbaijan
- List of diplomatic missions of Azerbaijan
- Visa policy of Azerbaijan
- Visa requirements for Azerbaijani citizens
