= Embassy of Azerbaijan, Moscow =

Embassy of Azerbaijan in Moscow Посольство Азербайджана в Москве
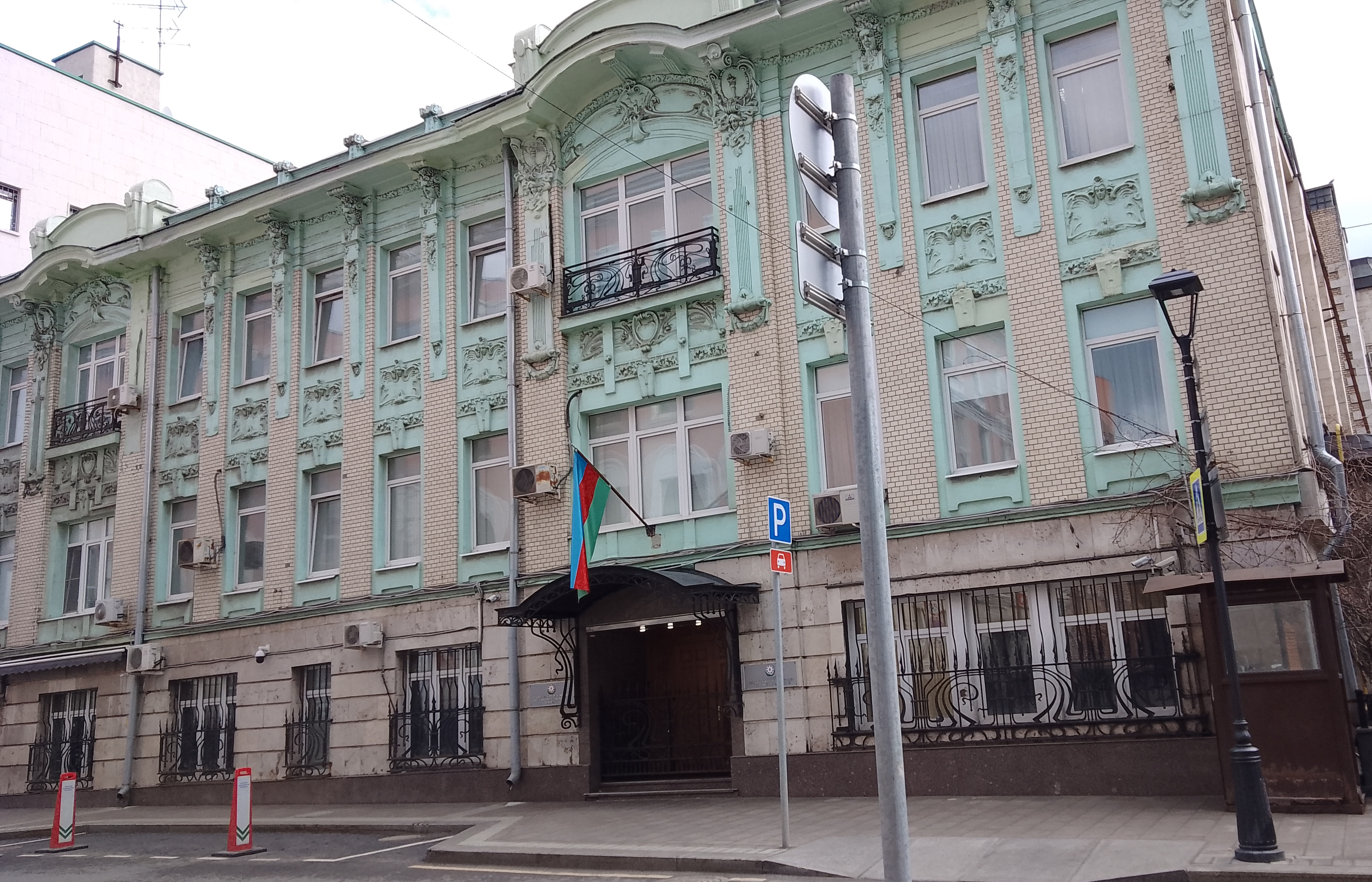
- Location: Moscow
- Address: 16 Leontyevsky Lane
- Coordinates: 55°45′38″N 37°36′19″E
- Ambassador: Rakhman Mustafayev

The Embassy of Azerbaijan in Moscow is the diplomatic mission of the Republic of Azerbaijan to the Russian Federation. It is located at 16 Leontyevsky Lane (Russian: Леонтьевский переулок, 16) in the Presnensky District of Moscow.

== See also ==
- Azerbaijan–Russia relations
- Diplomatic missions in Russia
