= Outline of Azerbaijan =

Country in the Caucasus region of Eurasia

The flag of Azerbaijan

The Coat of arms of Azerbaijan

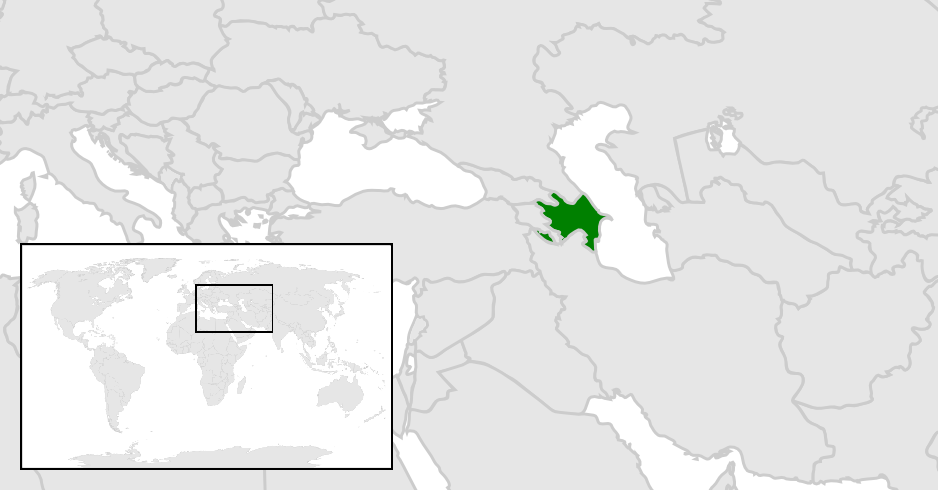
The location of Azerbaijan

Flag-map of Azerbaijan

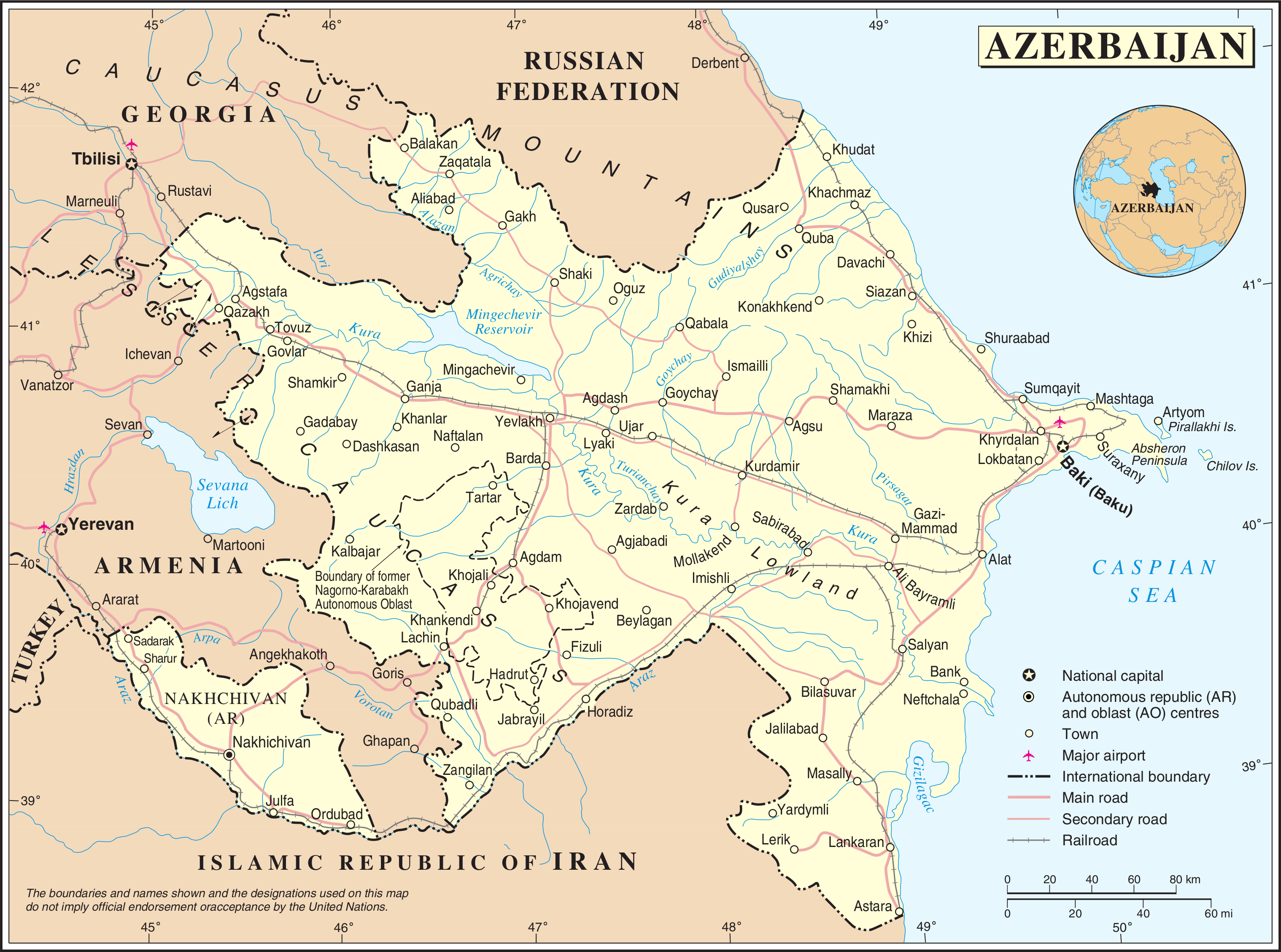
An enlargeable map of Azerbaijan

The following outline is provided as an overview of and topical guide to Azerbaijan:

Azerbaijan, officially the Republic of Azerbaijan, is a transcontinental and landlocked country at the boundary of Western Asia and Eastern Europe. It is a part of the South Caucasus region and is bounded by the Caspian Sea to the east, Russia's republic of Dagestan to the north, Georgia to the northwest, Armenia and Turkey to the west, and Iran to the south. Baku is the capital and largest city.

== General reference ==
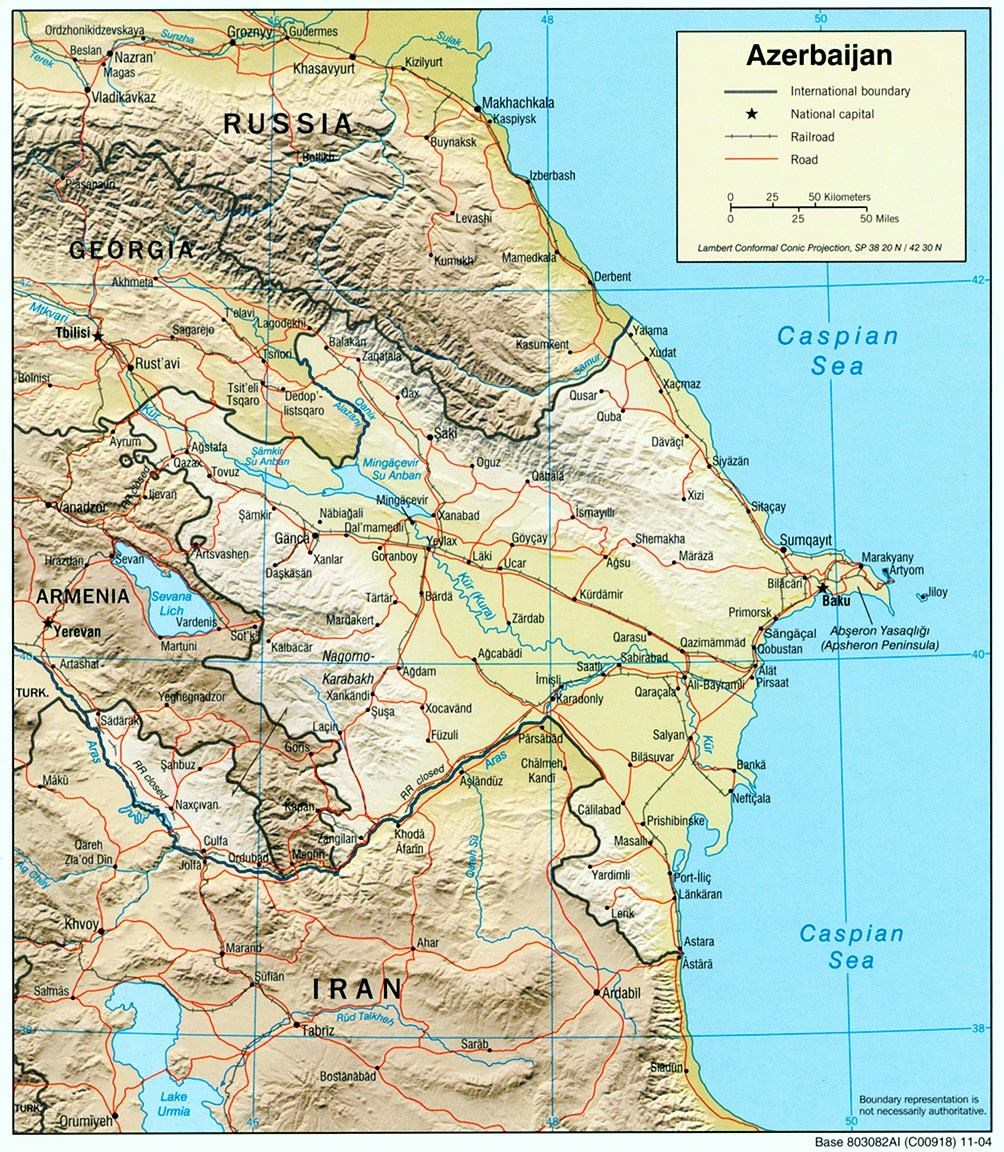
An enlargeable relief map of Azerbaijan

- Pronunciation: UK: /ˌæzərbaɪˈdʒɑːn, -ˈdʒæn/ AZ-ər-by-JA(H)N, US: /ˌɑːzərbaɪˈdʒɑːn, ˌæz-/ A(H)Z-ər-by-JAHN, Azerbaijani: [ɑːzæɾbɑjˈdʒɑn]
- Common English country name: Azerbaijan
- Official English country name: The Republic of Azerbaijan
- Common endonym(s):
- Official endonym(s):
- Adjectival(s): Azerbaijani, Azeri
- Demonym(s):
- Etymology: Name of Azerbaijan
- International rankings of Azerbaijan
- ISO country codes: AZ, AZE, 031
- ISO region codes: See ISO 3166-2:AZ
- Internet country code top-level domain: .az

== Geography of Azerbaijan ==
An enlargeable topographic map of Azerbaijan

Geography of Azerbaijan

- Azerbaijan is: a landlocked country (though it has a coast on the non-freshwater lake, the Caspian Sea)
- Location:
  - Eurasia
    - Asia
      - Western Asia
        - Caucasus (between Europe and Asia)
          - South Caucasus
  - Time zone: Azerbaijan Time (UTC+04)
  - Extreme points of Azerbaijan
    - High: Bazarduzu Dagi 4,485 m (14,715 ft)
    - Low: Caspian Sea −28 m (−92 ft)
  - Land boundaries: 2,013 km

Armenia 787 km
Iran 611 km
Georgia 322 km
Russia 284 km
Turkey 9 km

- Coastline: none

- Population of Azerbaijan: 9,165,000(2011) - 93rd most populous country
- Area of Azerbaijan: 86,600 square kilometres (33,400 sq mi) - 113th largest country
- Atlas of Azerbaijan

=== Environment of Azerbaijan ===
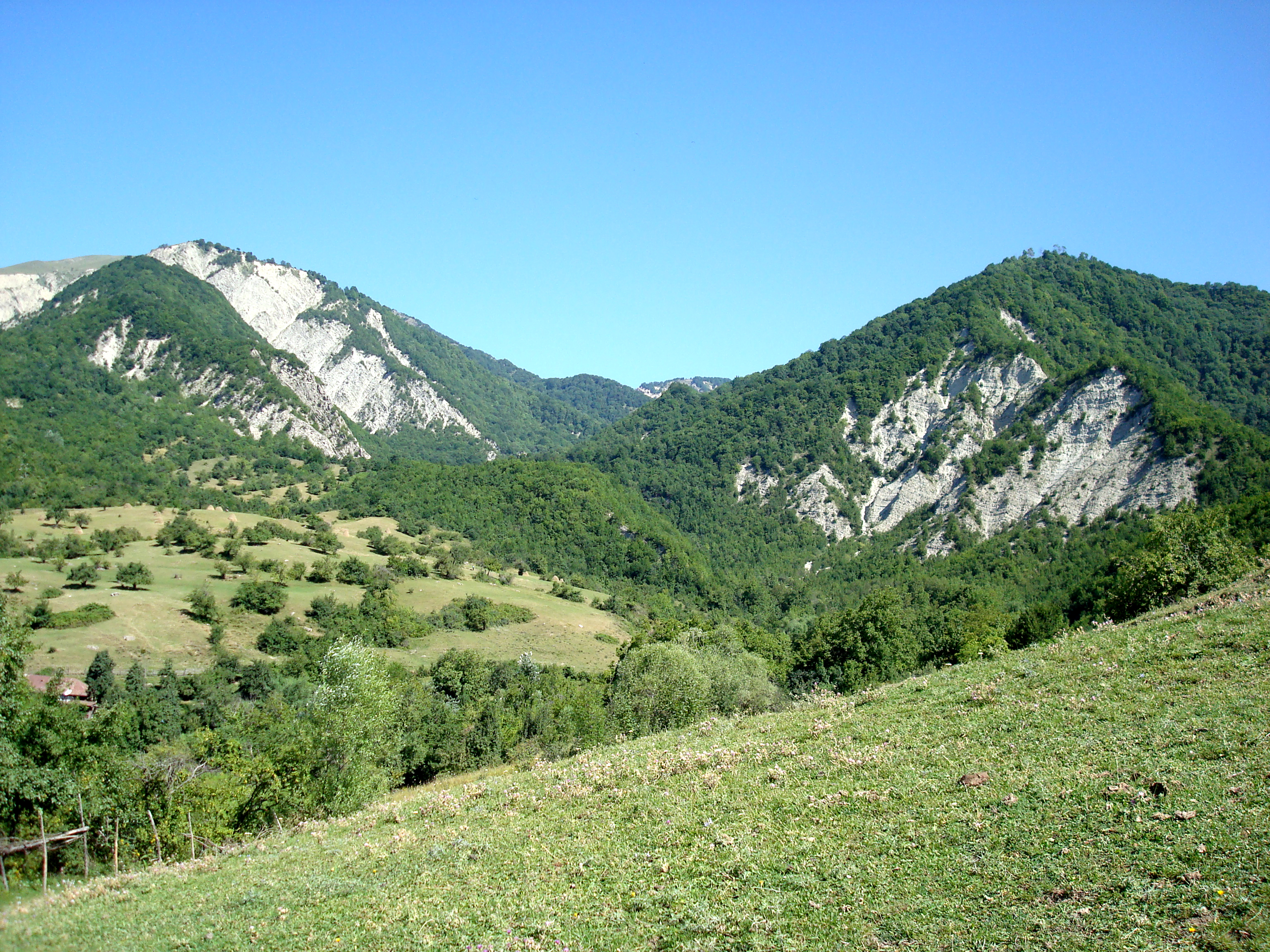
Ismailli State Reserve occupies the southern slopes of the Caucasus Mountains.

Environment of Azerbaijan

- Climate of Azerbaijan
- Geology of Azerbaijan
- Orography of Azerbaijan
- Environmental issues in Azerbaijan
- Renewable energy in Azerbaijan
- Geology of Azerbaijan
- Protected areas of Azerbaijan
  - Biosphere reserves in Azerbaijan
  - National parks of Azerbaijan
- Wildlife of Azerbaijan
  - Flora of Azerbaijan
  - Fauna of Azerbaijan
    - Birds of Azerbaijan
    - Mammals of Azerbaijan

==== Natural geographic features of Azerbaijan ====
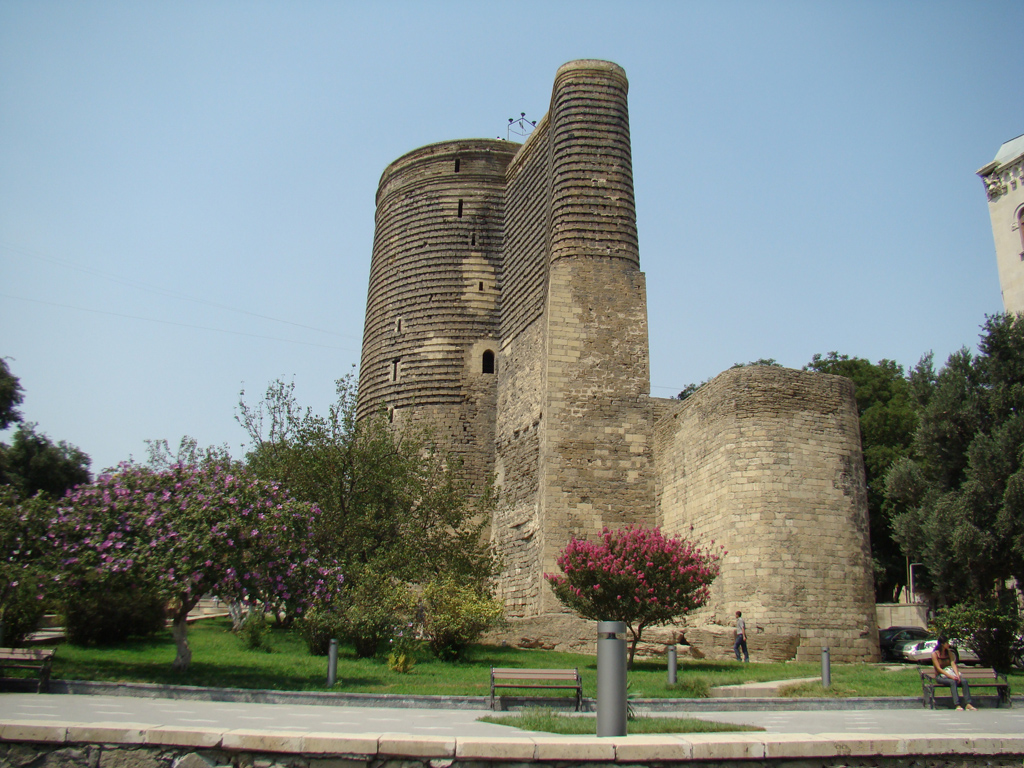
Maiden Tower, located in Old City (Baku), is a UNESCO world heritage site.

- Glaciers of Azerbaijan
- Islands of Azerbaijan
- Lakes of Azerbaijan
- Mountains of Azerbaijan
  - Volcanoes in Azerbaijan
- Rivers of Azerbaijan
  - Waterfalls of Azerbaijan
- Valleys of Azerbaijan
- World Heritage Sites in Azerbaijan

=== Regions of Azerbaijan ===
==== Ecoregions of Azerbaijan ====
List of ecoregions in Azerbaijan

==== Administrative divisions of Azerbaijan ====
Administrative divisions of Azerbaijan

- Districts of Azerbaijan
  - Cities of Azerbaijan
  - 1 Autonomous Republic
  - Municipalities of Azerbaijan

===== Districts of Azerbaijan =====
Map of administrative divisions of Azerbaijan.

There are 67 districts in Azerbaijan and 11 cities, Out of these districts and cities, 7 districts and 1 city are located within the Autonomous Republic:

- Absheron (Abşeron) (includes an exclave in Baku)
- Agjabadi (Ağcabədi)
- Agdam (Ağdam)
- Agdash (Ağdaş)
- Agstafa (Ağstafa)
- Agsu (Ağsu)
- Astara
- Balakan (Balakən)
- Barda (Bərdə)
- Beylagan (Beyləqan)
- Bilasuvar (Biləsuvar)
- Jabrayil (Cəbrayıl)
- Jalilabad (Cəlilabad)
- Dashkasan (Daşkəsən)
- Shabran (Şabran)
- Fizuli (Füzuli)
- Gadabay (Gədəbəy) (borders an exclave of Armenia)
- Goranboy
- Goychay (Göyçay)
- Hajigabul (Hacıqabul)
- Imishli (İmişli)
- Ismailli (İsmayıllı)
- Kalbajar (Kəlbəcər) (de facto partially in Nagorno-Karabakh Republic)
- Kurdamir (Kürdəmir)
- Lachin (Laçın)
- Lankaran (Lənkəran)
- Lerik
- Masally (Masallı)
- Neftchala (Neftçala)
- Oguz (Oğuz)
- Qabala (Qəbələ)
- Qakh (Qax)
- Qazakh (Qazax) (includes two exclaves in Armenia)
- Qobustan
- Quba
- Qubadli (Qubadlı)
- Qusar
- Saatly (Saatlı)
- Sabirabad
- Shaki (Şəki)
- Salyan
- Shamakhi (Şamaxı)
- Shamkir (Şəmkir)
- Samukh (Samux)
- Siazan (Siyəzən)
- Shusha (Şuşa)
- Tartar (Tərtər)
- Tovuz (borders an exclave of Armenia)
- Ujar (Ucar)
- Khachmaz (Xaçmaz)
- Goygol formerly Khanlar (Xanlar)
- Khizi (Xızı)
- Khojali (Xocalı)
- Khojavend (Xocavənd)
- Yardymli (Yardımlı)
- Yevlakh (Yevlax)
- Zangilan (Zəngilan)
- Zaqatala
- Zardab (Zərdab)

Nakhchivan Autonomous Republic

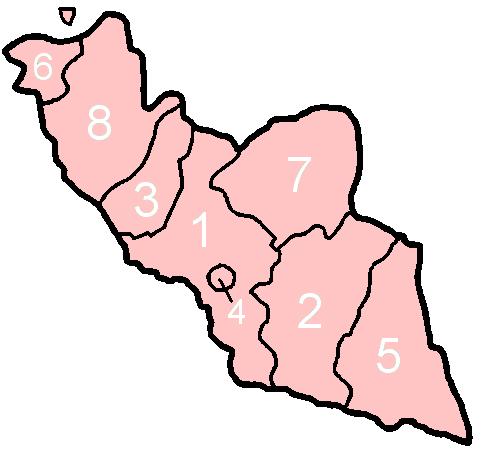
1. Babek District; 2. Julfa District; 3. Kangarli District; 4. Nakhchivan (city) / 5. Ordubad District; 6. Sadarak District; 7. Shahbuz District; 8. Sharur District

Capital of Azerbaijan: Baku

=== Demography of Azerbaijan ===
Demographics of Azerbaijan

== Government and politics of Azerbaijan ==
Politics of Azerbaijan

- Form of government: unitary semi-presidential republic
- Capital of Azerbaijan: Baku
- Elections in Azerbaijan
- Political parties in Azerbaijan
- Taxation in Azerbaijan

=== Branches of government ===
Government of Azerbaijan

==== Executive branch of the government of Azerbaijan ====
- Head of state: President of Azerbaijan, Ilham Aliyev
- Vice President of Azerbaijan,
- Head of government: Prime Minister of Azerbaijan, Ali Asadov
- Cabinet of Azerbaijan

==== Legislative branch of the government of Azerbaijan ====
- National Assembly (Azerbaijan)

==== Judicial branch of the government of Azerbaijan ====
Judiciary of Azerbaijan

- Supreme Court of Azerbaijan

=== Foreign relations of Azerbaijan ===
Foreign relations of Azerbaijan

- Diplomatic missions in Azerbaijan
- Diplomatic missions of Azerbaijan

==== International organization membership ====
The Republic of Azerbaijan is a member of:

- Asian Development Bank (ADB)
- Black Sea Economic Cooperation Zone (BSEC)
- Commonwealth of Independent States (CIS)
- Council of Europe (CE)
- Economic Cooperation Organization (ECO)
- Euro-Atlantic Partnership Council (EAPC)
- European Bank for Reconstruction and Development (EBRD)
- Food and Agriculture Organization (FAO)
- General Confederation of Trade Unions (GCTU)
- International Atomic Energy Agency (IAEA)
- International Bank for Reconstruction and Development (IBRD)
- International Civil Aviation Organization (ICAO)
- International Criminal Police Organization (Interpol)
- International Development Association (IDA)
- International Federation of Red Cross and Red Crescent Societies (IFRCS)
- International Finance Corporation (IFC)
- International Fund for Agricultural Development (IFAD)
- International Labour Organization (ILO)
- International Maritime Organization (IMO)
- International Monetary Fund (IMF)
- International Olympic Committee (IOC)
- International Organization for Migration (IOM)
- International Organization for Standardization (ISO)
- International Red Cross and Red Crescent Movement (ICRM)
- International Telecommunication Union (ITU)
- International Telecommunications Satellite Organization (ITSO)
- International Trade Union Confederation (ITUC)
- Inter-Parliamentary Union (IPU)
- Islamic Development Bank (IDB)
- Multilateral Investment Guarantee Agency (MIGA)
- Nonaligned Movement (NAM) (observer)
- Organisation of Islamic Cooperation (OIC)
- Organization for Democracy and Economic Development (GUAM)
- Organization for Security and Cooperation in Europe (OSCE)
- Organisation for the Prohibition of Chemical Weapons (OPCW)
- Organization of American States (OAS) (observer)
- Partnership for Peace (PFP)
- Southeast European Cooperative Initiative (SECI) (observer)
- United Nations (UN)
- United Nations Conference on Trade and Development (UNCTAD)
- United Nations Educational, Scientific, and Cultural Organization (UNESCO)
- United Nations Industrial Development Organization (UNIDO)
- Universal Postal Union (UPU)
- World Customs Organization (WCO)
- World Federation of Trade Unions (WFTU)
- World Health Organization (WHO)
- World Intellectual Property Organization (WIPO)
- World Meteorological Organization (WMO)
- World Tourism Organization (UNWTO)
- World Trade Organization (WTO) (observer)

=== Law and order in Azerbaijan ===
Law of Azerbaijan

- Capital punishment in Azerbaijan
- Constitution of Azerbaijan
- Crime in Azerbaijan
- Corruption in Azerbaijan
- Human Trafficking in Azerbaijan
- Human rights in Azerbaijan
  - LGBT rights in Azerbaijan
  - Labour rights in Azerbaijan
  - Women in Azerbaijan
  - Media freedom in Azerbaijan
  - Freedom of religion in Azerbaijan
- Law enforcement in Azerbaijan

=== Military of Azerbaijan ===
Azerbaijani Armed Forces

- Command
  - Commander-in-chief: President of Azerbaijan
    - Ministry of Defence (Azerbaijan)
- Forces
  - Azerbaijani Land Forces
    - Azerbaijani National Guard
    - Azerbaijani Peacekeeping Forces
  - Azerbaijani Air and Air Defence Force
  - Azerbaijani Navy
- Paramilitary agencies
  - State Border Service (Azerbaijan)
    - Azerbaijani Coast Guard
  - Internal Troops of Azerbaijan
- Military history of Azerbaijan
- Military ranks of Azerbaijan

=== Local government in Azerbaijan ===
Local government in Azerbaijan

== History of Azerbaijan ==
History of Azerbaijan

- Timeline of the history of Azerbaijan
- Current events of Azerbaijan
- Military history of Azerbaijan

== Culture of Azerbaijan ==
Culture of Azerbaijan

- Architecture of Azerbaijan
- Azerbaijanis and ethnic minorities in Azerbaijan
- Cuisine of Azerbaijan
- Festivals in Azerbaijan
- Languages of Azerbaijan
- Media in Azerbaijan
- National symbols of Azerbaijan
  - Coat of arms of Azerbaijan
  - Flag of Azerbaijan
  - National anthem of Azerbaijan
- Prostitution in Azerbaijan
- Public holidays in Azerbaijan
- Records of Azerbaijan
- Religion in Azerbaijan
  - Christianity in Azerbaijan
  - Hinduism in Azerbaijan
  - Islam in Azerbaijan
  - Judaism in Azerbaijan
  - Sikhism in Azerbaijan
- World Heritage Sites in Azerbaijan

=== Art in Azerbaijan ===
- Art in Azerbaijan
- Cinema of Azerbaijan
- Literature of Azerbaijan
- Music of Azerbaijan
- Television in Azerbaijan
- Theatre in Azerbaijan

=== Sport in Azerbaijan ===
Sport in Azerbaijan

- Football in Azerbaijan
- Azerbaijan at the Olympics

== Economy and infrastructure of Azerbaijan ==
Economy of Azerbaijan

- Economic rank, by nominal GDP (2007): 79th (seventy-ninth)
- Agriculture in Azerbaijan
- Banking in Azerbaijan
  - National Bank of Azerbaijan
- Communications in Azerbaijan
  - Internet in Azerbaijan
- Companies of Azerbaijan
- Currency of Azerbaijan: Manat
  - ISO 4217: AZN
- Energy in Azerbaijan
  - Energy in Azerbaijan
  - Energy policy of Azerbaijan
  - Oil industry in Azerbaijan
- Health care in Azerbaijan
- Mining in Azerbaijan
- Azerbaijan Stock Exchange
- Tourism in Azerbaijan
  - Visa policy of Azerbaijan
- Transport in Azerbaijan
  - Airports in Azerbaijan
  - Rail transport in Azerbaijan
  - Roads in Azerbaijan

== Education in Azerbaijan ==
Education in Azerbaijan

- Ministry of Education of Azerbaijan
- Primary education
  - Required: Education through the eighth grade is compulsory.
- Higher education
  - Total enrollment: 105,000+ (2009)
  - Faculty:
    - 11,566 professors
    - 12,616 other faculty members
  - Universities in Azerbaijan
    - Total: 51
      - 36 state-run universities
      - 15 private universities
    - List of universities in Baku
- Libraries
  - National Library of Azerbaijan

== See also ==
Azerbaijan

- List of international rankings
- Member states of the United Nations
- Outline of geography
  - Outline of Asia
    - Outline of Nagorno-Karabakh
