= Youth in Azerbaijan =

This article is related to the composition, activities, healthcare, lifestyles and other issues of young people living in Azerbaijan.

== Demographics ==
According to the State Statistics Committee, the total number of population was 9898.1 thousand. The Youth in Azerbaijan aged 14–25, consisted of 25.5 percent of the population in 2018, numbering 2519,3 thousand individuals. 1302,4 of them were men, 1216,9 of were women.

== Youth policy ==
Youth policy of Azerbaijan is an important part of state policy. The state youth policy is a state-defined system of priorities and measures taken to create favorable conditions for young people, to realize their knowledge and skills, their natural potential. The state youth policy is implemented by government agencies, is reflected in the relevant legal documents. The main directions of youth policy are defined by the Law "On Youth Policy" of the Republic of Azerbaijan as follows:

1. Spiritual and moral upbringing of youth and their roles in cultural life;
2. State care for talented youth;
3. Health protection for young people and their physical development;
4. Ensuring employment success for young people;
5. State support to young families;
6. State support to youth organizations.

The First Youth Forum of Azerbaijan was held on February 2, 1996, by the initiative of the Ministry of Youth, Sport and Tourism of the Republic of Azerbaijan and by the decree of the President of the Republic of Azerbaijan. About 2000 delegates from all regions of the Republic participated in the forum. The objectives of state bodies, youth organizations and every young person were identified at the forum.

== Volunteering service ==
The "Azerbaijan Volunteering Service" is the Azerbaijani model of European Volunteer Service was created by National Council of Youth Organizations of Azerbaijan Republic in 2013 with the support of the Ministry of Youth and Sport of Azerbaijan Republic. The objective of the program is advancing volunteering among young people and motivating to volunteering activities, leading to the development of voluntary philosophy, engaging youth and enlarge the activities of "Youth Houses".

== Youth House ==
In accordance with the article 5.5 of the AR 2002 "Youth Policy" adopted in 2007, "Strengthening of patriotic work among youth, their harmonious development and timing their spare time, psychological rehabilitation of youth "Youth house", social service foundations has been established according to related executive power in order to arrange legitimate and informational assistance. According to article #4.1.7 of the "State Youth Program of Azerbaijan" (2005-2009), it is planned to create a "Youth house" network of social services institution.

Youth Houses in Binagadi, Khazar, Garadagh, Sabunchu, Surakhani districts have been built and given to use concurring to the relevant passages of the Action Plan of the State Program on Socio-Economic Advancement of Baku and its rural settlements in 2011-2013.

It is arranged to build "Youth House" in Sumgayit, Ganja, Mingachevir, Shirvan, Gazakh, Shaki, Barda, Guba, Nakhchivan, and Shamakhy in accordance with the article #6.1.5 of the Action Plan of the State Program "Azerbaijani Youth in 2011-2015". The Youth Houses in Ganja, Mingechevir, Sumgayit, Shirvan, Nakhchivan, and Gazakh are already finished and given to use, and the constructions of Youth Houses in Sheki, Barda, Guba and Shamakhi districts are continuing and planned to be put into utilizing by the end of 2018. At the moment, the number of "Youth House" has reached 37.

The main purpose of "Youth homes" is creating a healthy condition to support and advancement of youth initiatives, recognize and realize youth like themselves, and also assist in the work of youth and sports institution in regions.

The direction of the activities of "Youth Houses": informal education; youth participation; psychosocial support; healthy lifestyle; choice of occupation; information-consulting; the arrangement of leisure time; volunteer activities and others.

== Youth Foundation ==
The Youth Foundation under the President of the Republic was established by Decree No. 826 of the President dated February 7, 2011. The Foundation was established in accordance with Article 6.1.4 of the Action Plan on Implementation of the State Program on "Azerbaijani Youth in 2011-2015" which approved by the Decree of the President of the Republic of Azerbaijan, dated July 7, 2011.

The main purpose of the foundation's activity is to support science, culture, education and other social issues related with the youth strategy, including international projects and programs (hereinafter - the project), focused on financing in a grant form, festival, conference, seminar, organization of the Olympics and other occasions, as well as other projects that provide financial assistance to young people.

The activities of the Foundation are as follows:

- to participate in the formulation and implementation of youth policy;
- to take part in the arrangement of the projects of normative legal acts in the field of youth policy;
- to support innovative ideas about the scientific, social and authoritative zones of government and local self-governance bodies involved in execution of youth, youth organizations, as well as youth policy;
- to take measures to ensure the youth participation in the socio-political, socio-economic and cultural life of the country, to stimulate and increase their entrepreneurship.

== National Youth Day ==
The 2nd of February is celebrated as Youth Day in Azerbaijan. It was affirmed as Youth Day by the declare of President Heydar Aliyev in 1997. Youth Day was celebrated for the first time in Azerbaijan. Starting from 1996, the celebration of the Youth Day has been celebrated in other CIS countries and Eastern European countries, too.

== See also ==
- Demographics of Azerbaijan
