= Environmental issues in Azerbaijan =

Like most former republics of the Soviet Union, Azerbaijan experienced rapid economic development which has led to an increasingly negative impact on the environment, including the inefficient usage of natural resources. The government of Azerbaijan has aimed to increase environmental protection and ensure rational utilization of natural resources, and has introduced a number of important laws, legal documents and state programs to improve the ecological situation in the country. However, these precautionary laws have not been as effective as they were meant to be. Transparency has been a consistent issue in Azerbaijan, as NGOs who are given legal authority to collect data from the oil refineries are often blocked or dismissed, and their information is gathered unofficially. Domestic oil producers have often evaded the regulations, and have not prevented oil leaks into the Caspian Sea. In the next 30 years, Azerbaijan will produce more oil than it produced during the 20th century, and currently there is little coordination or environmental precaution in the oil drilling operations. There is also a lack of communication with neighboring countries bordering the Caspian Sea.

The Absheron Peninsula, which meets the Caspian Sea and where the capital Baku is located, is the ecologically most devastated area in the world due to oil spills and widespread use of toxic agrochemicals, including DDT.

== Soil pollution ==
Assessments carried out in 2024 report that about 42% of Azerbaijan's territory is affected by soil erosion, while around 7% is severely salinized, which reduces agricultural productivity. According to the National Ecosystem Assessment, approximately 14,000 hectares of land in Azerbaijan are contaminated with oil and petroleum products, particularly in long-industrialized coastal zones.

== Water pollution and scarcity ==
Recent analyses indicate that Azerbaijan is becoming one of the most water-scarce countries globally, with declining river inflows and worsening Caspian Sea conditions linked to climate change and pollution.

== Environmental impact of mining ==
Azerbaijan's mining sector (including gold, copper–molybdenum, and polymetallic deposits) has been associated with local soil and water contamination. In particular mining activities in the Gadabay and Dashkasan districts have been linked to soil pollution and degradation of vegetation, as per recent environmental studies. Research in Dashkasan also reports heavy-metal contamination of soil and water sources caused by ore extraction and waste disposal.

== Health effects ==
The most severe forms of pollution are the following: dumped petroleum during the Soviet Period, discharge of sewage, depleted stocks of sturgeon, severe air pollution, and heavy use of pesticides and fertilizers. Many of the locals are constantly exposed to the contaminants, and they have accepted to live in it. Some even comment on the beauty of the ocean with the layer of oil that glistens on the top. Unfortunately, the smell and the ramifications of constant exposure to harmful vapors are a concern to the local health, particularly the coastline of Azerbaijan. The ramifications of petrol-fueled industries are the following health concerns: harms to the pulmonary, digestive, circulatory, and immune systems. In the worst cases, genetic mutations can occur. Groundwater is also affected by the oil spills, causing cancers and bacterial diseases like cholera and hepatitis.

== Other forms of pollution ==
The following are the principal ecological problems of Azerbaijan:

- The pollution of water resources by way of introduction of contaminated water, including transnational pollution
- The supply of low-quality water to inhabited regions, the loss of fresh water prior to its delivery to the end consumers, insufficient development of sewer systems
- Air pollution from industrial plants and transport vehicles
- Degradation of soil (erosion, desertification, etc.)
- Deforestation as the burning trees affects the climate cycle
- Improper regulation of industry and housing, as well as hazardous solid wastes
- Decline in biological diversity
- Decline in forest reserves and fauna, especially fish results

== Forests ==
Azerbaijan had a 2018 Forest Landscape Integrity Index mean score of 6.55/10, ranking it 72nd globally out of 172 countries.

=== Tree cover extent and loss ===
Global Forest Watch publishes annual estimates of tree cover loss and 2000 tree cover extent derived from time-series analysis of Landsat satellite imagery in the Global Forest Change dataset. In this framework, tree cover refers to vegetation taller than 5 m (including natural forests and tree plantations), and tree cover loss is defined as the complete removal of tree cover canopy for a given year, regardless of cause.

For Azerbaijan, country statistics report cumulative tree cover loss of 8,334 ha (83.34 km^{2}) from 2001 to 2024 (about 0.7% of its 2000 tree cover area). For tree cover density greater than 30%, country statistics report a 2000 tree cover extent of 1,268,606 ha (12,686.06 km^{2}). The charts and table below display this data. In simple terms, the annual loss number is the area where tree cover disappeared in that year, and the extent number shows what remains of the 2000 tree cover baseline after subtracting cumulative loss. Forest regrowth is not included in the dataset.

Annual tree cover loss in Azerbaijan, 2001–2024. View chart definition.
Tree cover extent in 2000 minus cumulative tree cover loss in Azerbaijan, 2001–2024 (loss-only residual; does not account for gain). View chart definition.

Annual tree cover extent and loss
Year	Tree cover extent (km2) (Note: This residual measure does not include forest regrowth.)	Annual tree cover loss (km2)
2001	12,680.53	5.53
2002	12,668.99	11.54
2003	12,658.60	10.39
2004	12,652.75	5.85
2005	12,650.28	2.47
2006	12,645.03	5.25
2007	12,639.95	5.08
2008	12,635.23	4.72
2009	12,631.51	3.72
2010	12,626.01	5.50
2011	12,624.54	1.47
2012	12,618.57	5.97
2013	12,617.08	1.49
2014	12,613.80	3.28
2015	12,613.53	0.27
2016	12,613.28	0.25
2017	12,612.48	0.80
2018	12,611.72	0.76
2019	12,611.60	0.12
2020	12,611.37	0.23
2021	12,610.52	0.85
2022	12,609.06	1.46
2023	12,604.45	4.61
2024	12,602.72	1.73

== See also ==
- List of environmental issues
