= International rankings of Azerbaijan =

The following is a list of international rankings of the Azerbaijan:

== General ==
- United Nations: Human Development Index 2010, ranked 69 out of 172 countries

== Economics ==
- Fraser Institute: Economic Freedom 2011: ranked 84–86 out of 141 countries;
- The Heritage Foundation and The Wall Street Journal: Index of Economic Freedom 2011: ranked 92 out of 183 countries;
- International Finance Corporation: Ease of Doing Business Index 2011, ranked 54 out of 183 countries;
- CIA World Factbook: GDP growth rate 2018, ranked 170 out of 193 countries (1.3% growth rate);
- International Monetary Fund: GDP (nominal) 2006, ranked 84 out of 181 countries;
- International Monetary Fund: GDP (nominal) per capita 2006, ranked 104 out of 182 countries;
- World Economic Forum: Global Competitiveness Index 2006–2007, ranked 64 out of 125 countries.

== Political ==
- Economist Intelligence Unit: Democracy Index, 2010: ranked 135 out of 167 countries;
- Freedom House: Freedom of Press, 2011: ranked 171 out of 196 countries;
- Fund for Peace: Failed State Index, 2011: ranked 63 out of 177 countries (the best is 177, the worst is 1);
- Transparency International: Corruption Perceptions Index, ranked 130 out of 163 countries;
- Reporters Without Borders: Worldwide press freedom index, 2010: ranked 152 out of 178 countries.

== Technological ==
- World Intellectual Property Organization: Global Innovation Index 2026, ranked 85 out of 139 countries

== Environmental ==
- Yale University: Environmental Sustainability Index, ranked 99 out of 146 countries

== Demographics ==
- Population 2006, ranked 92 out of 221 countries

== Other ==
Organization	Survey	Ranking
Institute for Economics and Peace	Global Peace Index	114 out of 144
KOF Swiss Economic Institute	KOF Globalization Index	95 out of 181
United Nations Development Programme	Human Development Index	86 out of 182
Transparency International	Corruption Perceptions Index	143 out of 180
World Economic Forum	Global Competitiveness Report	51 out of 133

== See also ==
- Lists of countries
- Lists by country
- List of international rankings
