= Local government in Azerbaijan =

Local government in Azerbaijan is organized on the basis of municipal governments. Municipal representatives are elected by universal, direct, and equal elections by secret and individual ballot. Municipalities may also establish executive bodies. The current system of local government began in December 1999.

== Rights of citizens ==
Azerbaijani citizens have the right to voice their opinion on and make suggestions to municipal governments. Citizens may participate in local government both directly or through freely chosen representatives regardless of race, nationality, religion, sex, origin, convictions, property status, social position, political party, or trade union membership. Azerbaijanis have the right to elect and be elected to local government bodies. Municipalities must provide citizens with documents and materials related to human and civil rights and freedoms, and must inform citizens about their activities.

== Legislation on local government ==
Local government is regulated by the Constitution and laws of Azerbaijan. In Nakhchivan, it is also regulated by the constitution and laws of the Nakhchivan AR.

== Municipal charters ==
Municipalities have charters governing their operation. A charter may be adopted by a municipal meeting or a citizens' meeting. A charter specifies the composition and borders of the municipality and the structure and powers of municipal government including municipal offices and the procedures for adopting local laws.

== See also ==
- National Assembly of Azerbaijan
- Cabinet of Azerbaijan
