= Mineral industry of Azerbaijan =

As of 2017, Azerbaijan produced a range of metals and industrial minerals, including aluminum, bentonite, copper, gold, iodine, limestone, silver and steel.

Azerbaijan's importance as a world mineral producer, however, was based on its petroleum extracting industry. The country has been a significant oil producer for more than a century, but recent focus has been on developing offshore resources in the Caspian Sea. Production from the country’s Soviet-era fields is in decline, but since independence, foreign direct investment in offshore fields has revitalized the oil sector through the development of large-scale new projects and the refurbishment of older ones. In 2005, Azerbaijan had signed more than 20 major agreements to develop oilfields with approximately 30 companies from 15 countries.

As of 2017, oil production has entered a decline, falling by 5.6% since 2016. Crude petroleum has declined in Azerbaijan since 2010, when the nation produced a record 50.8 MT. Production in 2017 was only 38.7 MT.

In 2005, Oil extraction and refining accounted for more than 75% of the value of industrial production. The oil extraction and refining sectors and the metallurgy and metal fabrication sectors employed more than 60,000 people in 2005. The country was becoming a major producer of oil, producing far more than it consumed, but its natural gas production in 2005 was still significantly below its consumption. The country was increasing its steel products production at the Baku Steel company, a privately owned company that produced steel products from steel scrap.

== Production ==
In 2005, production increased for practically all mineral commodities. Crude petroleum production increased by more than 43% compared with that of 2004. The country was developing its steel industry, although it is still on a small scale.

== Trade ==
Fuels accounted for 76% of the value of exports in 2005. The country’s major export was crude petroleum, almost all of which was sold on world markets rather than supplied to other CIS countries. Other mineral exports included petroleum refinery products and alumina. The country imported a variety of mineral commodities, including natural gas.

== Mineral resources ==
Azerbaijan’s major mineral wealth is its oil and gas reserves. Offshore hydrocarbon structures in the Caspian Sea accounted for most of the country’s oil and gas production. Azerbaijan’s proven crude oil reserves were estimated to range from 7 billion to 13 billion barrels (Gbbl) [or from about 950 million metric tons (Mt) to 1.8 billion metric tons (Gt)] based on various industry journals and Government sources. The State Oil Company of the Azerbaijan Republic (SOCAR) has estimated that proven reserves are 17.5 Gbbl (about 2.4 Gt) using the Soviet reserve classification system. This evaluation was not based on market economy criteria and may include resources that are not economically viable. Estimates of natural gas reserves also vary. According to the Oil & Gas Journal, Azerbaijan has proven natural gas reserves of roughly 30 trillion cubic feet (about 850 billion cubic meters, and BP p.l.c. estimates that the country has 48 trillion cubic feet (about 1.4 trillion cubic meters) of proven gas reserves.

== Outlook ==
Although some effort has been made to promote balanced mineral development of all the country’s mineral resources, the country’s economic development has depended primarily on the development of its large offshore oil and gas resources. These resources are expected to be the country’s chief source of revenue for the coming decades.

In 2004, Azerbaijan exported approximately 211,000 barrels per day (33,500 m^{3}/d) of oil. Exports are expected to more than double to 478,000 bbl/d (76,000 m^{3}/d) in 2006 and to reach as high as 1.1 million barrels per day (170,000 m^{3}/d) by 2008.

Azerbaijan was a net natural gas importer in 2005. The country is expected to become a significant gas exporter following the development of the Shah Deniz natural gas deposit, which is considered to be one of the world’s largest natural gas field discoveries of the past 20 years. According to BP (the project operator), Shah Deniz has potential recoverable reserves of about 15 trillion cubic feet (about 424 billion cubic meters) of natural gas and 600 million barrels (95,000,000 m^{3})—about 82 Mt] of condensate. Other industry and trade sources have estimated that the field contains as much as 35 trillion cubic feet (990 km^{3}) of gas. The field is being developed by the Shah Deniz consortium, whose members include BP, LukAgip, National Iranian Oil Company (NICO) International, SOCAR, Statoil ASA of Norway, TotalFinaElf, and Türkiye Petrolleri Anonim Ortaklig (TPAO) of Turkey.

In the first phase of the Shah Deniz field’s development, production of natural gas for export was expected to begin in late 2006. In the second phase, according to BP, the Shah Deniz project could produce an additional 1 trillion cubic feet (28 km^{3}) per year of natural gas by as early as 2015.

Although Azerbaijan lacks any infrastructure for the export of natural gas, efforts were underway to secure export routes and customers for gas deliveries beginning in 2006. The main conduit for Azerbaijan’s natural gas exports would be the South Caucasus Pipeline, also known as Baku-Tbilisi-Erzurum, which would run parallel to the Baku-T’bilisi-Ceyhan oil pipeline for most of its route before connecting to the Turkish gas pipeline network near the town of Horasan in Turkey. Pipeline construction began in late 2004 and was scheduled to be completed during the first quarter of 2007. The pipeline was expected to carry 233 billion cubic feet (6.6×10^{9} m^{3}) per year initially; this volume could be increased later to up to 700 billion cubic feet (2.0×10^{10} m^{3}) per year with the future addition of compression stations.

With the new pipeline infrastructure in place, Shah Deniz would be capable of producing approximately 350 billion cubic feet (9.9×10^{9} m^{3}) per year of natural gas by 2009. Supplies of natural gas from Shah Deniz and associated gas from the Azeri Chirag Gunashli (AGC) and the Bakhar-2 projects are expected to make Azerbaijan self-sufficient in natural gas and to result in significant export revenues.
