= Demographics of Azerbaijan =

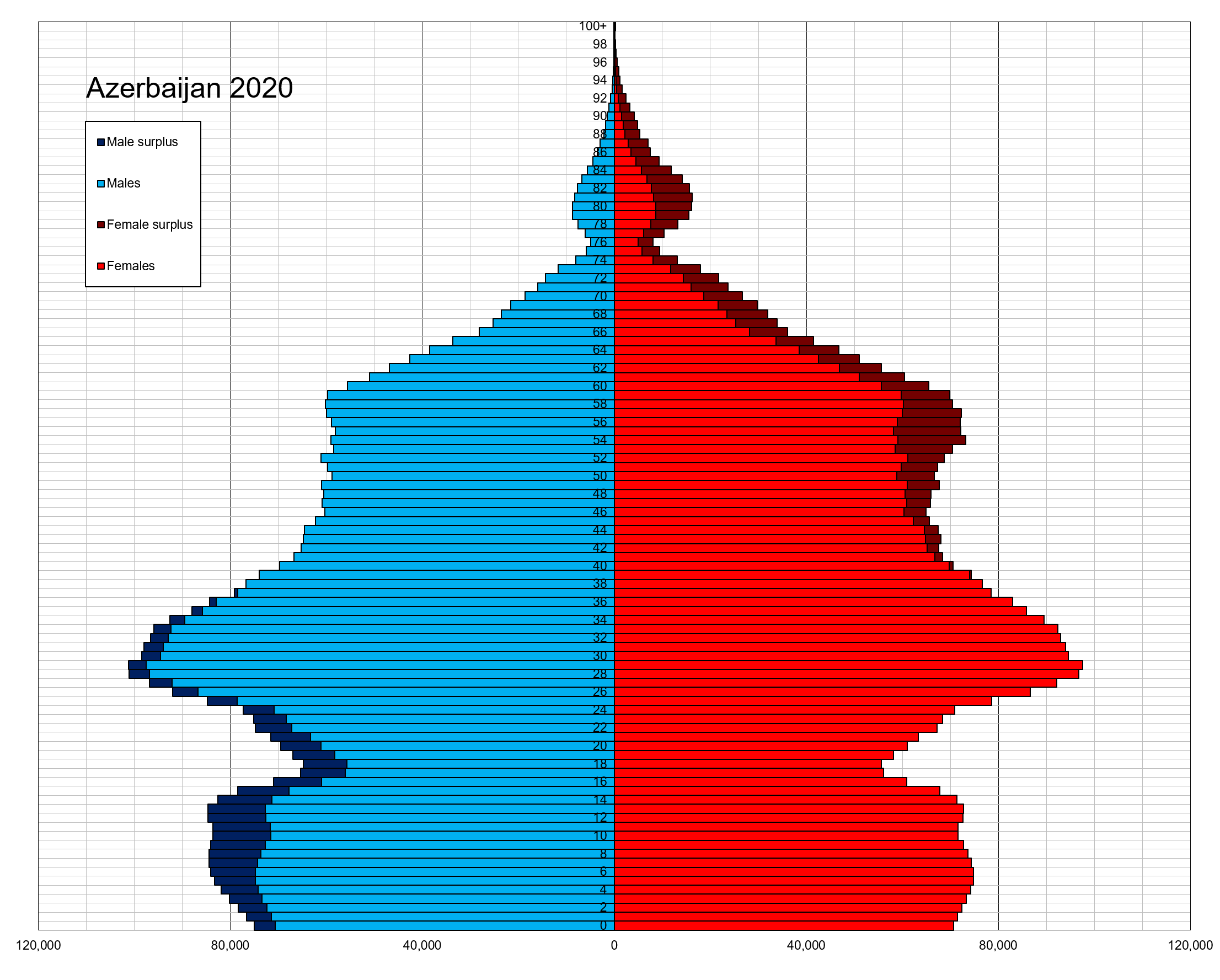
- Population pyramid of Azerbaijan in 2020
- Population: ▲10,271,638 (June 1, 2026)
- Density: ▲118.61/km^{2} (307.2/sq mi) (June 1, 2026)
- Growth rate: ▼0.4% (2025)
- Birth rate: ▼9.4 births/1,000 population (2025)
- Death rate: 5.8 deaths/1,000 population (2025)
- Life expectancy: ▲75.9 years (2024 est.)
  - male: ▲73.5 years
  - female: ▲78.6 years
- Fertility rate: ▼1.35 children born/woman (2025 est.)
- Infant mortality: ▼10.9 deaths/1,000 live births (2024 est.)
- Net migration rate: ▼ −0.6 migrant(s)/1,000 population (2024 est.)
- Immigrant share: 2.1% (2024)

Age structure
- 0–14 years: ▼19.6%
- 15–64 years: ▲69.8%
- 65 and over: ▲10.6% (2025 est.)

Sex ratio
- Total: 1 male(s)/female (2024 est.)
- At birth: 1.15 male(s)/female
- Under 15: 1.11 male(s)/female
- 15–64 years: 1 male(s)/female
- 65 and over: 0.72 male(s)/female

Nationality
- Nationality: Azerbaijani(s)
- Major ethnic: Azeri (94.8%)
- Minor ethnic: Lezgin (1.7%); Talysh (0.9%); Russian (0.7%); Others (1.9%)

Language
- Official: Azerbaijani
- Spoken: Languages of Azerbaijan

This is a demography of the population of Azerbaijan including population density, ethnicity, education level, health of the populace, economic status, religious affiliations and other aspects of the population.

== Population and structure ==
10,200,013 people as of July 2024

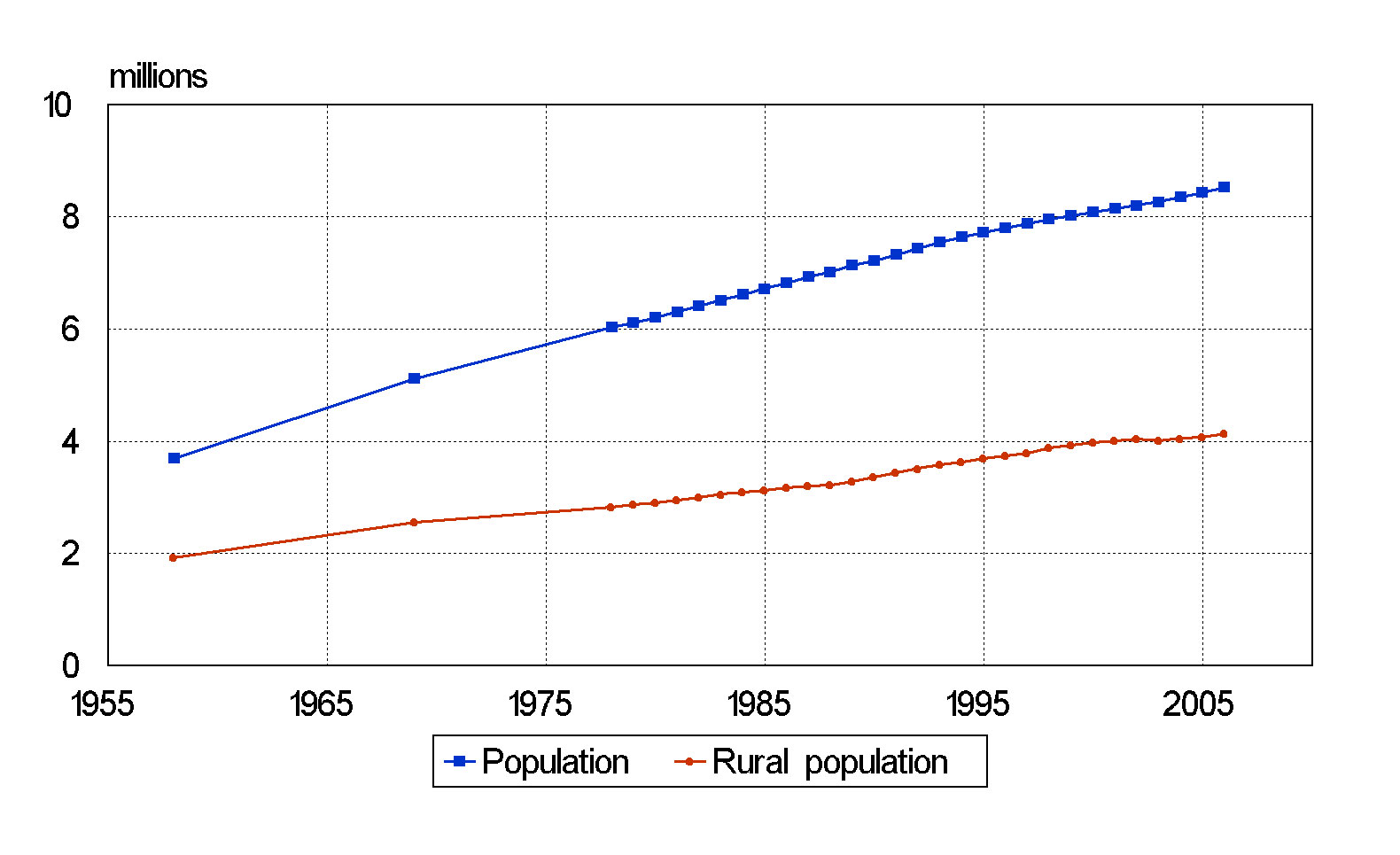
Azerbaijan: Population and rural population 1958–2006 (in millions). Statistical Committee of Azerbaijan, yearbooks from various years

Historical population
Year	Pop.	±% p.a.
1897	1,806,700	—
1908	2,014,300	+0.99%
1917	2,353,700	+1.75%
1926	2,313,600	−0.19%
1939	3,205,200	+2.54%
1959	3,697,700	+0.72%
1970	5,117,100	+3.00%
1979	6,028,300	+1.84%
1989	7,021,200	+1.54%
1999	7,953,400	+1.25%
2009	8,922,000	+1.16%
2019	9,981,457	+1.13%
2024	10,353,300	+0.73%

=== Structure of the population ===
Population Estimates by Sex and Age Group (01.I.2021):

Age group	Male	Female	Total	%
Total	5 053 800	5 065 300	10 119 100	100
0–4	374 400	329 400	703 800	6.96
5–9	454 100	394 700	848 800	8.39
10–14	379 900	328 300	708 200	7.00
15–19	333 000	291 500	624 500	6.17
20–24	362 800	327 600	690 400	6.82
25–29	447 700	421 800	869 500	8.59
30–34	465 500	473 900	939 400	9.28
35–39	411 600	424 300	835 900	8.26
40–44	349 200	355 000	704 200	6.96
45–49	292 100	314 500	606 600	5.99
50–54	304 700	338 500	643 200	6.36
55–59	299 100	339 800	638 900	6.31
60–64	256 800	292 500	549 300	5.43
65–69	143 500	175 200	318 700	3.15
70–74	82 100	109 400	191 500	1.89
75–79	33 500	49 900	83 400	0.82
80–84	40 100	63 500	103 600	1.02
85–89	15 200	23 000	38 200	0.38
90–94	6 300	9 100	15 400	0.15
95–99	1 600	2 200	3 800	0.04
100+	600	1 200	1 800	0.02
Age group	Male	Female	Total	Percent
0–14	1 208 400	1 052 400	2 260 800	22.34
15–64	3 522 500	3 579 400	7 101 900	70.18
65+	322 900	433 500	756 400	7.47

View source data.
View source data.
View source data.
View source data.

=== Urban and rural population ===
Year	1897	1908	1917	1920	1923	1930	1940	1941	1942	1943	1944	1945	1946	1947	1948	1949	1950	1960	1970	1980	1990	2000	2009	2010	2016	2019
City	305.1	–	560.2	405.8	486.0	750.9	1212.0	1239.8	1195.5	1138.1	1105.8	1118.5	1159.9	1163.1	1110.1	1149.1	1252.3	1835.2	2564.6	3247.5	3847.3	4116.4	4818.7	–		
Rural	1501.6	–	1793.5	1546.4	1377.0	1818.6	2062.0	2092.0	1961.6	1780.0	1670.9	1587.1	1574.6	1577.4	1589.2	1583.5	1606.6	1980.5	2552.5	2866.8	3284.6	3916.4	4078.6	–		
Total	1806.7	2014.3	2353.7	1952.2	1863.0	2569.5	3274.0	3331.8	3157.1	2918.1	2776.7	2705.6	2734.5	2740.5	2699.3	2732.6	2858.9	3815.7	5117.1	6114.3	7131.9	8032.8	8896.9	9000.0	9747.0	9981.4

In thousands

Notes about table

- To see the effect of periodical events on the population period until 1950 is not given in decades.

9,047,000 (2010)

== Vital statistics ==
=== Registered births and deaths ===
Notable events in Azerbaijan demographics:

- 1941-1945 – Second World War
- 1991 – Dissolution of the Soviet Union

	Average population	Live births	Deaths	Natural change	Crude birth rate (per 1000)	Crude death rate (per 1000)	Natural change (per 1000)	Crude migration rate (per 1000)	Total Fertility Rate
1935	2,933,800	65,245	32,134	33,111	22.0	10.8	11.2		
1936	3,004,300	75,761	34,966	40,795	24.9	11.5	13.4	10.6	
1937	3,082,600	110,341	40,787	69,554	35.3	13.1	22.2	3.9	
1938	3,167,400	99,729	40,937	58,792	31.3	12.8	18.5	9.0	
1939	3,205,200	101,529	39,828	61,701	31.4	12.3	19.1	−7.2	
1940	3,274,000	96,981	48,568	48,413	29.4	14.7	14.7	6.8	
1941	3,331,800	75,735	41,144	34,591	23.3	12.7	10.6	7.1	
1942	3,157,100	53,410	52,993	417	17.6	17.4	0.2	−52.6	
1943	2,918,100	28,958	43,510	−14,552	10.2	15.3	−5.1	−70.6	
1944	2,776,700	33,564	40,671	−7,107	12.2	14.8	−2.6	−45.9	
1945	2,705,600	39,818	39,027	791	14.6	14.3	0.3	-25.9	
1946	2,737,500	62,727	23,233	39,494	22.9	8.5	14.4	−2.6	
1947	2,719,900	80,046	23,509	56,537	29.4	8.6	20.8	−27.2	
1948	2,716,000	78,324	26,632	51,692	28.8	9.8	19.0	−20.4	
1949	2,795,800	83,760	29,102	54,658	30.0	10.4	19.6	9.8	
1950	2,896,200	90,280	27,746	62,534	31.2	9.6	21.6	14.3	
1951	2,995,000	100,979	27,331	73,648	33.7	9.1	24.6	9.5	
1952	3,102,900	106,687	30,244	76,443	34.4	9.7	24.6	11.4	
1953	3,170,600	101,378	29,707	71,671	32.0	9.4	22.6	−0.8	
1954	3,234,600	117,428	28,855	88,573	36.3	8.9	27.4	−7.2	
1955	3,326,000	125,599	25,074	100,525	37.8	7.5	30.2	−1.9	
1956	3,429,600	134,594	23,931	110,663	39.2	7.0	32.3	−1.2	
1957	3,539,700	139,529	25,667	113,862	39.4	7.3	32.2	−0.1	
1958	3,644,000	147,534	27,119	120,415	40.5	7.4	33.0	−3.5	
1959	3,754,300	155,872	26,086	129,786	41.5	6.9	34.6	−4.3	
1960	3,894,500	165,849	25,918	139,931	42.6	6.7	35.9	1.4	
1961	4,045,800	170,504	27,295	143,209	42.1	6.7	35.4	3.4	5.2
1962	4,168,200	168,341	30,901	137,440	40.4	7.4	33.0	−2.7	5.2
1963	4,293,600	175,033	30,230	144,803	40.8	7.0	33.7	−3.6	5.4
1964	4,439,300	176,546	31,841	144,705	39.8	7.2	32.6	1.3	5.5
1965	4,574,700	167,429	29,095	138,334	36.6	6.4	30.2	0.3	5.5
1966	4,708,200	166,545	31,657	134,888	35.4	6.7	28.6	0.6	5.3
1967	4,832,000	157,270	32,338	124,932	32.5	6.7	25.9	0.4	5.1
1968	4,948,500	158,962	32,950	126,012	32.1	6.7	25.5	−1.4	5.0
1969	5,061,100	148,078	35,428	112,650	29.3	7.0	22.3	0.5	4.8
1970	5,169,900	150,976	34,506	116,470	29.2	6.7	22.5	−1.0	4.7
1971	5,283,000	146,261	34,236	112,025	27.7	6.5	21.2	0.7	4.6
1972	5,391,500	137,752	35,658	102,094	25.6	6.6	18.9	1.6	4.1
1973	5,493,900	138,569	34,770	103,799	25.2	6.3	18.9	0.1	4.1
1974	5,594,100	139,084	36,082	103,002	24.9	6.5	18.4	−0.2	4.0
1975	5,689,100	141,857	39,291	102,566	24.9	6.9	18.0	−1.0	3.7
1976	5,781,000	147,199	38,029	109,170	25.5	6.6	18.9	−2.7	3.9
1977	5,876,200	146,822	39,035	107,787	25.0	6.6	18.3	−1.8	3.8
1978	5,974,200	148,812	39,936	108,876	24.9	6.7	18.2	−1.5	3.6
1979	6,069,300	153,080	43,022	110,058	25.2	7.1	18.1	−2.2	3.5
1980	6,160,500	154,974	43,064	111,910	25.2	7.0	18.2	−3.2	3.3
1981	6,257,800	164,577	42,898	121,679	26.3	6.9	19.4	−3.6	3.2
1982	6,357,600	160,425	42,376	118,049	25.2	6.7	18.6	−2.7	3.1
1983	6,459,800	168,644	42,944	125,700	26.1	6.6	19.5	−3.4	3.0
1984	6,567,900	174,437	44,845	129,592	26.6	6.8	19.7	−3.0	3.0
1985	6,670,200	177,657	45,179	132,478	26.6	6.8	19.9	−4.3	2.9
1986	6,770,300	186,609	45,344	141,265	27.6	6.7	20.9	−5.9	2.9
1987	6,875,400	184,585	45,744	138,841	26.8	6.7	20.2	−4.7	2.9
1988	6,972,900	184,350	47,485	136,865	26.4	6.8	19.6	−5.4	2.8
1989	7,074,800	181,631	44,016	137,615	25.7	6.2	19.5	−4.9	2.8
1990	7,175,200	182,989	42,819	140,170	25.5	6.0	19.5	−5.3	2.77
1991	7,271,300	190,353	44,659	145,694	26.2	6.1	20.0	−6.6	2.9
1992	7,382,100	181,361	51,258	130,103	24.6	6.9	17.6	−2.4	2.7
1993	7,494,800	174,618	52,809	121,809	23.3	7.0	16.3	−1.0	2.7
1994	7,596,600	159,761	54,921	104,840	21.0	7.2	13.8	−0.2	2.5
1995	7,684,900	143,315	50,828	92,487	18.6	6.6	12.0	−0.4	2.193
1996	7,763,000	129,247	48,242	81,005	16.6	6.2	10.4	−0.2	1.977
1997	7,838,300	132,052	46,962	85,090	16.8	6.0	10.9	−1.2	2.019
1998	7,912,000	123,996	46,299	77,697	15.7	5.9	9.8	−0.4	1.848
1999	7,990,100	117,539	46,295	71,244	14.7	5.8	8.9	1.0	1.716
2000	8,073,600	116,994	46,701	70,293	14.5	5.8	8.7	1.8	1.698
2001	8,152,900	110,356	45,284	65,072	13.5	5.6	7.9	1.9	1.590
2002	8,230,300	110,715	46,522	64,193	13.5	5.7	7.8	1.7	1.577
2003	8,309,200	113,467	49,001	64,466	13.6	5.9	7.7	1.9	1.592
2004	8,398,300	131,609	49,568	82,041	15.7	5.9	9.8	0.9	2.054
2005	8,447,400	141,901	51,962	89,939	16.8	6.2	10.7	−4.9	2.330
2006	8,553,100	148,946	52,248	96,698	17.4	6.1	11.3	1.2	2.329
2007	8,666,100	151,963	53,655	98,308	17.5	6.2	11.3	1.9	2.300
2008	8,779,900	152,086	52,710	99,376	17.3	6.0	11.3	1.8	2.252
2009	8,897,000	152,139	52,514	99,625	17.1	5.9	11.2	2.1	2.260
2010	8,997,600	165,643	53,580	112,063	18.4	6.0	12.4	−1.1	2.266
2011	9,111,100	176,072	53,762	122,310	19.3	5.9	13.4	−0.8	2.381
2012	9,235,100	174,469	55,017	119,452	18.9	6.0	12.9	0.7	2.336
2013	9,356,500	172,671	54,383	118,288	18.5	5.8	12.7	0.4	2.216
2014	9,477,100	170,503	55,648	114,855	18.0	5.9	12.1	0.8	2.176
2015	9,593,000	166,210	54,697	111,513	17.3	5.7	11.6	0.6	2.121
2016	9,705,600	159,464	56,648	102,816	16.4	5.8	10.6	1.1	2.036
2017	9,810,000	144,041	57,109	86,932	14.7	5.8	8.9	1.9	1.873
2018	9,898,000	138,982	57,250	81,732	14.0	5.8	8.2	0.8	1.757
2019	9,931,200	141,179	55,916	85,263	14.1	5.6	8.5	−5.1	1.797
2020	10,000,100	126,571	75,647	50,924	12.6	7.5	5.1	1.8	1.645
2021	10,044,700	112,284	76,878	35,406	11.1	7.6	3.5	1.9	1.476
2022	10,095,200	122,846	60,810	62,036	12.1	6.1	6.0	−1.0	1.667
2023	10,154,000	112,620	60,150	52,470	11.1	5.9	5.2	0.6	1.553
2024	10,202,800	102,310	58,909	43,401	10.0	5.8	4.2	0.5	1.429
2025	10,243,600	95,875	59,834	36,041	9.4	5.8	3.6	0.5	1.354
2026	10,270,000								1.19 (e)

(e)=estimation based on live births in 2026 so far shown in the current vital statistics below

=== Current vital statistics ===
Period	Live births	Deaths	Natural increase
January—September 2025	72,210	44,409	+27,801
January—September 2026	64,043	44,919	+19,124
Difference	▼ –8,167 (-11.31%)	▲ +510 (+1.15%)	▼ –8,677

Marriages and divorces

Period	Marriages	Divorces
January—September 2025	36,512	15,480
January—September 2026	31,085	15,030
Difference	▼ –5,427 (-14.86%)	▼ –450 (-2.91%)

=== Fertility Rate ===
Fertility Rate (TFR) (Wanted Fertility Rate) and CBR (Crude Birth Rate):

Year	Total		Urban		Rural	
Year	CBR	TFR	CBR	TFR	CBR	TFR
2006	17,2	2,0 (1,8)	15,6	1,8 (1,7)	19,3	2,3 (2,0)

Years	1895	1896	1897	1898	1899	1900	1901	1902	1903	1904
Total Fertility Rate in Azerbaijan	8.1	8.07	8.04	8.01	7.98	7.95	7.92	7.89	7.86	7.83

Years	1905	1906	1907	1908	1909	1910	1911	1912	1913	1914
Total Fertility Rate in Azerbaijan	7.8	7.77	7.74	7.71	7.68	7.65	7.62	7.59	7.56	7.53

Years	1915	1916	1917	1918	1919	1920
Total Fertility Rate in Azerbaijan	7.5	7.47	7.44	7.41	7.38	7.35

Years	1921	1922	1923	1924	1925	1926	1927	1928	1929	1930
Total Fertility Rate in Azerbaijan	7.32	7.29	7.26	7.23	7.2	7.14	7.08	7.01	6.95	6.89

Years	1931	1932	1933	1934	1935	1936	1937	1938	1939	1940
Total Fertility Rate in Azerbaijan	6.83	6.76	6.7	6.64	6.58	6.52	6.45	6.39	6.33	6.27

Years	1941	1942	1943	1944	1945	1946	1947	1948	1949	1950
Total Fertility Rate in Azerbaijan	6.2	6.14	6.08	6.02	5.96	5.89	5.83	5.77	5.71	5.07

==== Regional differences ====
As of 2025, Azerbaijan has a crude birth rate of 9.4‰. Rural areas tend to have higher birth rates compared to urban areas (10.8‰ and 8.1‰, respectively).

Crude birth rate by towns and regions in Azerbaijan (per 1,000)
Town/region	1990	2000	2010	2025
Baku (city)	19.5	▼11.6	▲17.3	▼7.9
Absheron District	28.2	▼14.5	▼11.9	▼5.4
Sumqayit (city)	25.1	▼12.5	▲14.9	▼5.9
Ganja (city)	20.7	▼9.5	▲12.5	▼6.5
Gusar District	23.3	▼8.8	▲10.9	▼9.5
Aghstafa District	15.9	▼14.7	▲18.6	▼11.0
Tovuz District	26.3	▼17.4	▲18.5	▼11.5
Shamkir District	27.8	▼13.7	▲21.2	▼10.3
Gadabay District	25.1	▼18.0	▲19.5	▼9.8
Dashkasan District	33.8	▼18.5	▲20.5	▼11.1
Samukh District	–	11.3	▲16.7	▼10.6
Goranboy District	26.9	▼15.4	▲19.0	▼11.0
Goygol District	23.9	▼12.8	▲17.2	▼11.3
Azerbaijan	25.9	▼14.7	▲18.5	▼9.4

As of 2025, the economic regions of Mountainous Shirvan and Karabakh have the highest birth rate in Azerbaijan. On the other hand, the Absheron-Khizi economic region and the Nakhchivan Autonomous Republic have the lowest birth rate in the country. The highest death rate is in the Gazakh-Tovuz economic region, while the lowest is in Absheron-Khizi.

Vital statistics by economic regions of the Republic of Azerbaijan
Economic region	CBR (‰)	CDR (‰)	Natural increase (‰)
Baku city	7.9	6.1	1.8
Absheron-Khizi Economic Region	5.7	3.9	1.8
Ganja-Dashkasan Economic Region	8.5	6.5	2.0
Shaki-Zagatala Economic Region	9.1	6.0	3.1
Lankaran-Astara Economic Region	11.2	5.5	5.7
Guba-Khachmaz Economic Region	10.5	6.1	4.4
Central Aran Economic Region	10.6	6.0	4.6
Karabakh Economic Region	11.3	6.6	4.7
East Zangezur Economic Region	11.1	6.1	5.0
Mountainous Shirvan Economic Region	11.8	5.7	6.1
Nakhchivan Autonomous Republic	7.3	4.9	2.4
Gazakh-Tovuz Economic Region	10.6	7.0	3.6
Mil-Mughan Economic Region	10.8	5.3	5.5
Shirvan-Salyan Economic Region	10.7	6.1	4.6
Republic of Azerbaijan	9.4	5.8	3.6

Life expectancy in Azerbaijan since 1950

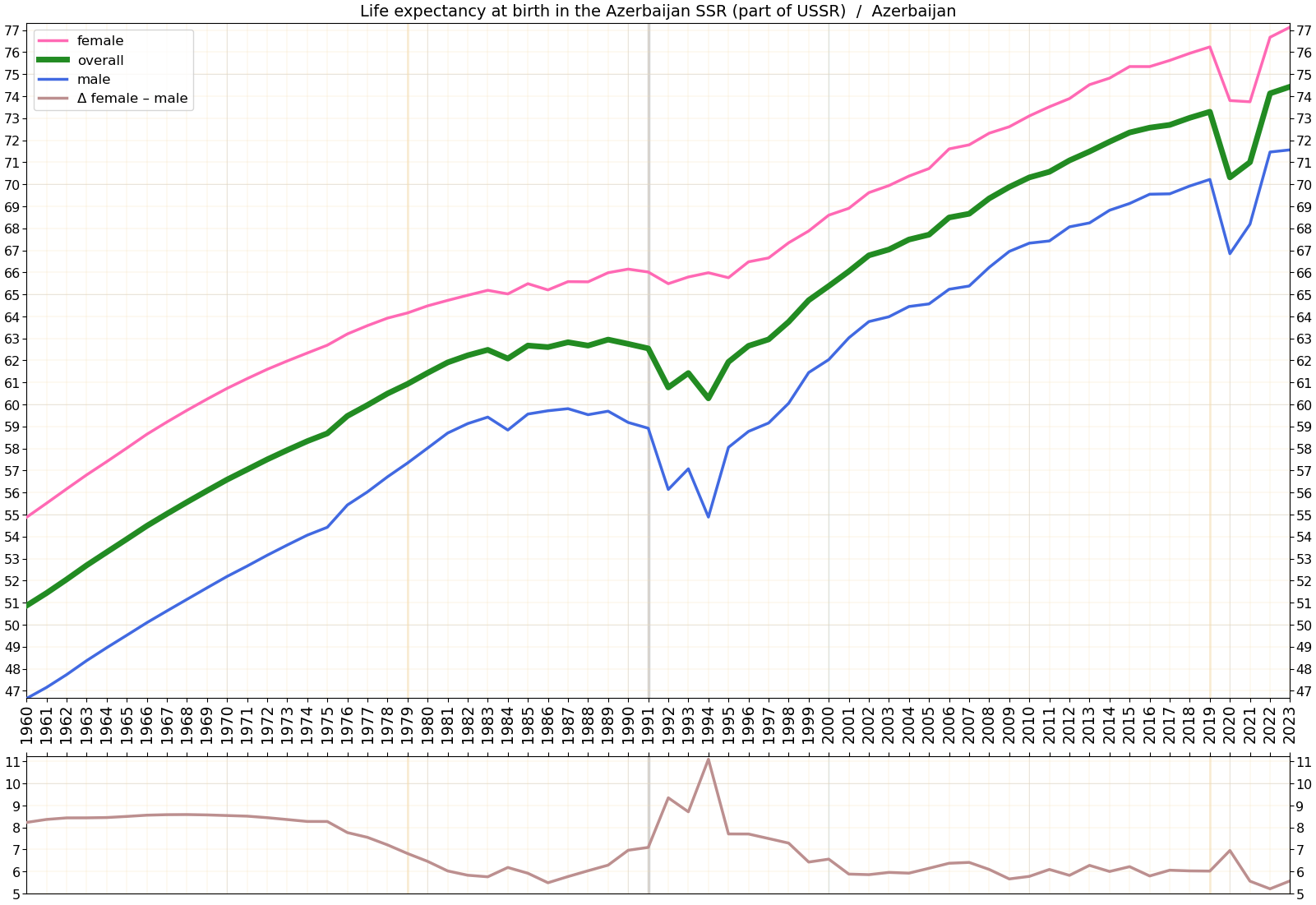
Life expectancy in Azerbaijan since 1960 by gender

=== Life expectancy ===
Period	Life expectancy in Years	Period	Life expectancy in Years
1950–1955	58.4	1985–1990	65.2
1955–1960	60.4	1990–1995	64.6
1960–1965	61.5	1995–2000	66.2
1965–1970	62.6	2000–2005	67.4
1970–1975	63.5	2005–2010	70.1
1975–1980	63.9	2010–2015	71.6
1980–1985	64.4		

Source: UN World Population Prospects

== Ethnic groups ==
Population of Azerbaijan according to ethnic group 1926–2019
Ethnic group	Census 1926^{1}		Census 1939^{2}		Census 1959^{3}		Census 1970^{4}		Census 1979^{5}		Census 1989^{6}		Census 1999^{7}		Census 2009^{8}		Census 2019^{9}	
Ethnic group	Number	%	Number	%	Number	%	Number	%	Number	%	Number	%	Number	%	Number	%	Number	%
Azerbaijanis	1,437,977	62.1	1,870,471	58.4	2,494,381	67.5	3,776,778	73.8	4,708,832	78.1	5,804,980	82.7	7,205,464	90.6	8,172,809	91.6	9,436,123	94.8
Lezgins	37,263	1.6	111,666	3.5	98,211	2.7	137,250	2.7	158,057	2.6	171,395	2.4	178,021	2.2	180,312	2.02	167,570	1.68
Armenians	282,004	12.2	388,025	12.1	442,089	12.0	483,520	9.4	475,486	7.9	390,505	5.6	~120,700 (Note: AzStat: As a result of expert calculations based on the results of the 1989 census, the number of Azerbaijani citizens of Armenian descent living in the Nagorno-Karabakh region was 120086 people (57904 men, 62182 women). According to the latest census in 1999, the number of Azerbaijani citizens of Armenian descent living in other parts of the country, except Nagorno-Karabakh, was 659 (47 men and 612 women))	1.7	~120,300 (Note: AzStat: As a result of expert calculations based on the results of the 1989 census, the number of Azerbaijani citizens of Armenian descent living in the Nagorno-Karabakh region was 120,086,120,097 (57,904 men, 62,182 women). According to the latest census in 2009, the number of Azerbaijani citizens of Armenian descent living in other parts of the country, except Nagorno-Karabakh, was 220 (17 men, 203 women). (See.))	0.02	178	0.00
Talysh	77,323	3.3	87,510	2.7	85	0.0					21,169	0.3	76,841	1.0	111,996	1.26	87,578	0.88
Russians	220,545	9.5	528,318	16.5	501,282	13.6	510,059	10.0	475,255	7.9	392,304	5.6	141,687	1.8	119,307	1.34	71,046	0.71
Avars	19,104	0.8	15,740	0.5	17,254	0.5	30,735	0.6	35,991	0.6	44,072	0.6	50,871	0.6	49,838	0.56	48,636	0.49
Turks	95	0.0	600	0.0	202	0.0	8,491	0.2	7,926	0.1	17,705	0.3	43,454	0.5	37,975	0.43	30,516	0.31
Tatars	9,948	0.4	27,591	0.9	29,370	0.8	31,353	0.6	31,204	0.5	28,019	0.4	30,011	0.4	25,911	0.29	17,712	0.18
Tats	28,443	1.2	2,289	0.1	5,887	0.2	7,769	0.2	8,848	0.1	10,239	0.1	10,922	0.1	25,218	0.28	27,657	0.28
Ukrainians	18,241	0.8	23,643	0.7	25,778	0.7	29,160	0.6	26,402	0.4	32,345	0.5	28,984	0.4	21,509	0.24	13,947	0.14
Tsakhurs	15,552	0.7	6,464	0.2	2,876	0.1	6,208	0.1	8,546	0.1	13,318	0.2	15,877	0.2	12,289	0.14	13,361	0.13
Udins	2,445	0.1	6,464	0.2	3,202	0.1	5,492	0.1	5,841	0.1	6,125	0.1	4,152	0.1	3,821	0.04	3,540	0.04
Georgians	9,500	0.4	10,196	0.3	9,526	0.3	13,595	0.3	11,412	0.2	14,197	0.2	14,877	0.2	9,912	0.11	8,442	0.08
Jews	20,578	0.9	41,245	1.3	40,198	1.1	48,652	1.0	35,487	0.6	30,792	0.4	8,916	0.1	9,084	0.10	5,094	0.05
Kurds	41,193^{7}	1.8	6,005	0.2	1,487	0.0	5,488	0.1	5,676	0.1	12,226	0.2	13,075	0.2	6,065	0.07	4,105	0.04
Others	94,00	4.1	85,387	2.7	25,889	0.7	22,531	0.4	31,552	0.5	31,787	0.5	9,541	0.1	16,095	0.11	15,904	0.16
Total	2,314,571		3,205,150		3,697,717		5,117,081		6,026,515		7,021,178		7,953,438		8,922,447		9,951,409	
^{1} Source: . ^{2} Source: . ^{3} Source: . ^{4} Source: . ^{5} Source: . ^{6} Source: . ^{7} Almost all Kurds lived in Kurdistan Uyezd, the territory between Armenia and Nagorno Karabakh. In the late 1930s Soviet authorities deported most of the Kurdish population of Azerbaijan to Kazakhstan.^{9} Source:

Ethno-linguistic groups in Caucasia after the dissolution of Republic of Artsakh

== Migration ==
Azerbaijan Migration Data (1990–present)
Year	Immigration (000s)	Emigration (000s)	Net Migration (000s)
1990	84.3	137.9	-53.6
1991	66.3	106.4	-40.1
1992	35.7	49.9	-14.2
1993	16.3	28.5	-12.2
1994	8.6	19.6	-11.0
1995	6.2	16.0	-9.8
1996	5.8	13.2	-7.4
1997	7.5	15.7	-8.2
1998	5.4	10.5	-5.1
1999	4.8	9.1	-4.3
2000	4.4	9.9	-5.5
2001	2.6	7.3	-4.7
2002	1.2	4.3	-3.1
2003	2.5	3.8	-1.3
2004	2.4	2.8	-0.4
2005	2.0	2.9	-0.9
2006	2.2	2.6	-0.4
2007	2.0	3.1	-1.1
2008	3.6	2.5	1.1
2009	2.3	1.4	0.9
2010	2.2	0.8	1.4
2011	2.2	0.5	1.7
2012	2.2	0.2	2.0
2013	3.1	0.8	2.3
2014	1.9	0.8	1.1
2015	2.7	1.6	1.1
2016	3.2	1.7	1.5
2017	3.1	1.9	1.2
2018	3.2	1.6	1.6
2019	2.0	1.6	0.4
2020	1.7	0.6	1.1
2021	2.4	0.6	1.8
2022	2.9	1.1	1.8
2023	3.7	2.5	1.2

== Religion ==
Religion in Azerbaijan (ARDA 2020 est.)
1. Shia (66.2%)
2. Sunni (30.0%)
3. Christianity (2.42%)
4. None (1.30%)
5. Other (0.13%)
- Islam 97.3% (predominantly Shia)
- Christian 2.6%
- Other <0.1%
- Unaffiliated <0.1%

(2020 est.)

note: religious affiliation for the majority of Azerbaijanis is largely nominal, percentages for actual practicing adherents are probably much lower.

== See also ==
- Census in Azerbaijan
