= National Youth Day (Azerbaijan) =

Azerbaijani holiday

- Begins: 1997
- Date: 2 February
- Next time: 2 February 2027
- Frequency: annual

National Youth Day is an Azerbaijani holiday. In 1997, the President of the Republic of Azerbaijan, Heydar Aliyev, signed an order according to that day of the 1st Forum of Azerbaijani Youth – 2 February, was declared as "Azerbaijan National Youth Day".

== History ==
On 2 February 1996, at the initiative of the Ministry of Youth and Sport of the Republic of Azerbaijan, as well as the decree of the President of the Republic of Azerbaijan, Heydar Aliyev, the I Forum of Azerbaijani Youth was held. About 2,000 young people from all regions of the republic participated in the forum.

In the course of the forum, the participants identified the responsibilities facing by government agencies, youth organizations, and every representative of the youth. The implementation of effective measures for the comprehensive development of young people, in the sphere of resolving their problems, was set as the main task for the relevant organizations.

== Additional information ==
Other CIS countries and Eastern European countries started to celebrate their national youth days after celebration of youth day in Azerbaijan.

In the world only on 8 to 12 August 1998, at Lisbon Conference, the United Nations announced 12 August as the International Youth Day.
