= Languages of Azerbaijan =

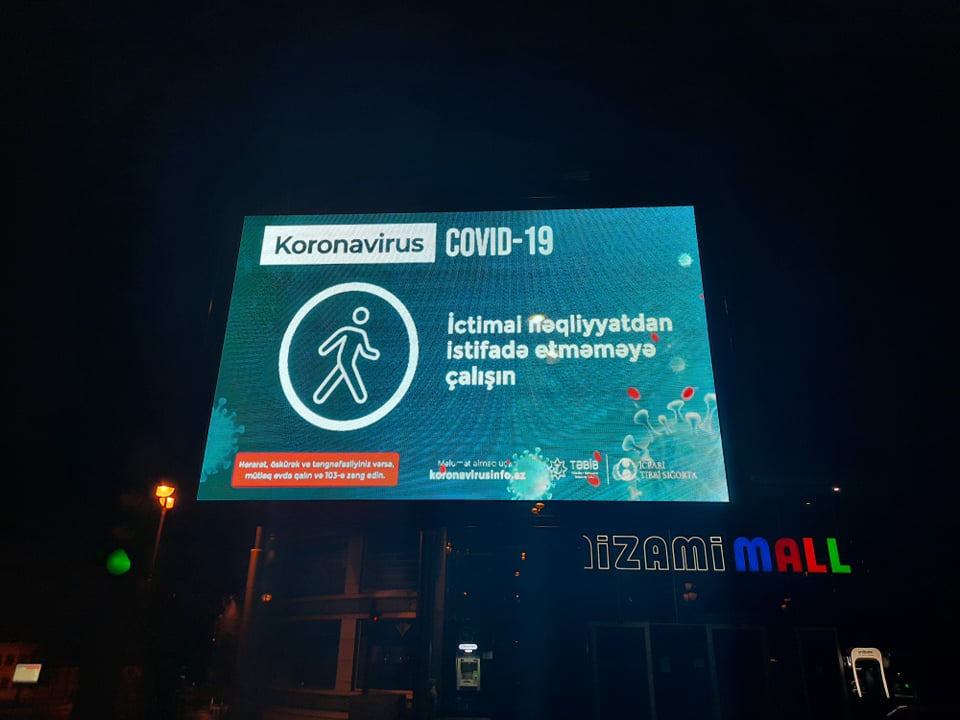
- Sign about the COVID-19 pandemic in Azerbaijani
- Official: Azerbaijani
- Minority: Lezgian, Talysh, Avar, Russian, Tat, Tsakhur, Khinalug, Turkish
- Foreign: English, Russian, Turkish
- Signed: Azerbaijani Sign Language
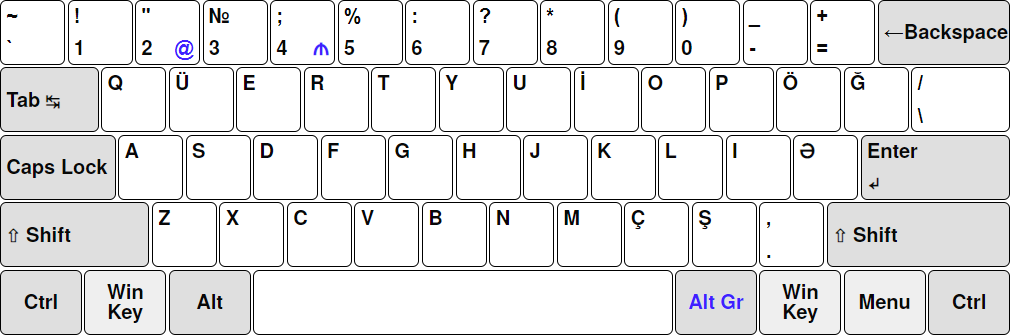
- Keyboard layout: QÜERTY and PÜŞUD

Azerbaijani is the sole official language of Azerbaijan and is spoken by the majority of its population. However, several minority languages also exist in the country, including Lezgian, Talysh, Avar, Russian, and Tat. Additionally, languages such as Tsakhur and Khinalug are spoken by a small percentage of the population.

== General ==
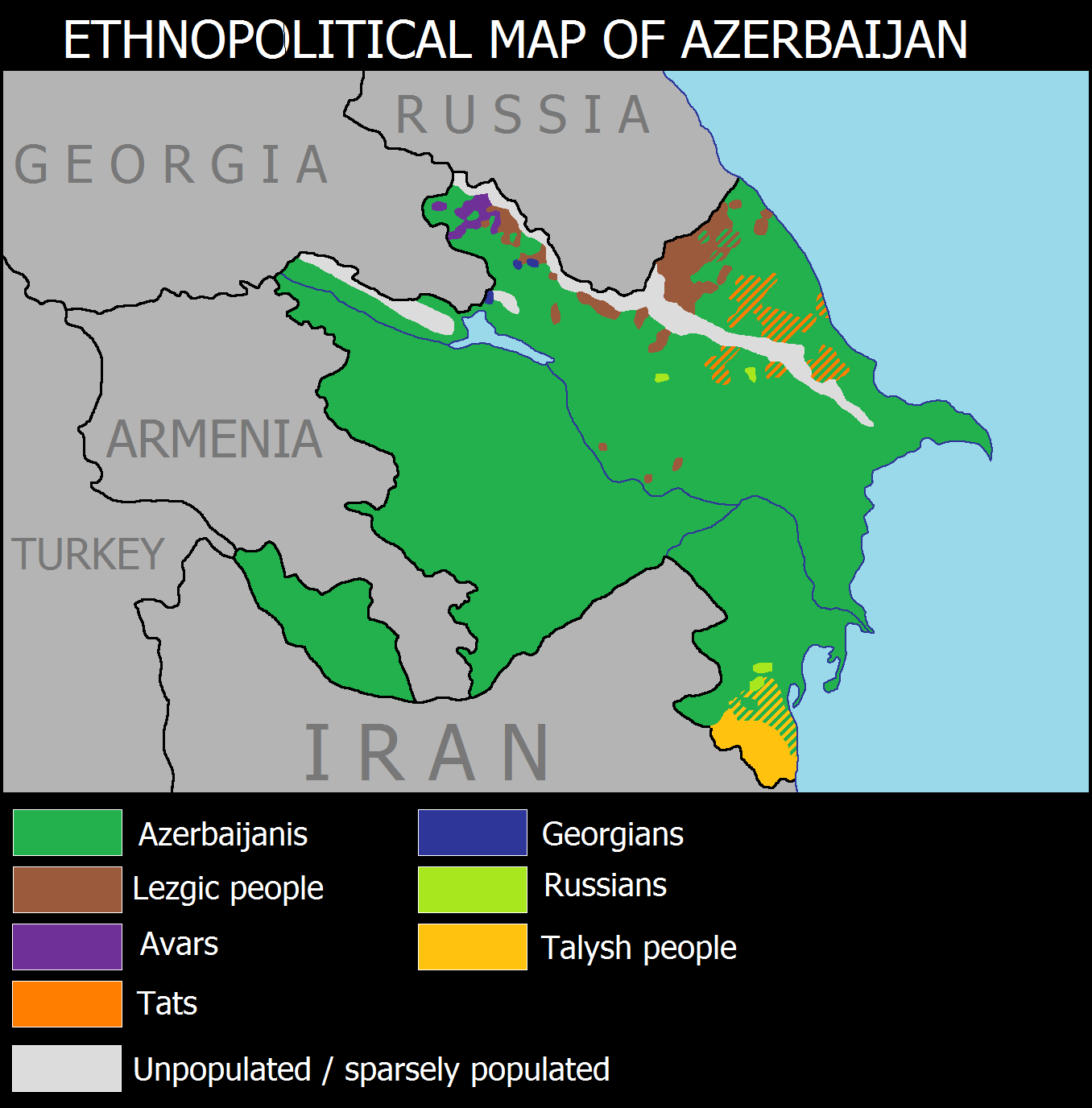
Ethnicities of Azerbaijan (2024, after the collapse of the breakaway Republic of Nagorno-Karabakh and the flight of Nagorno-Karabakh Armenians in 2023).

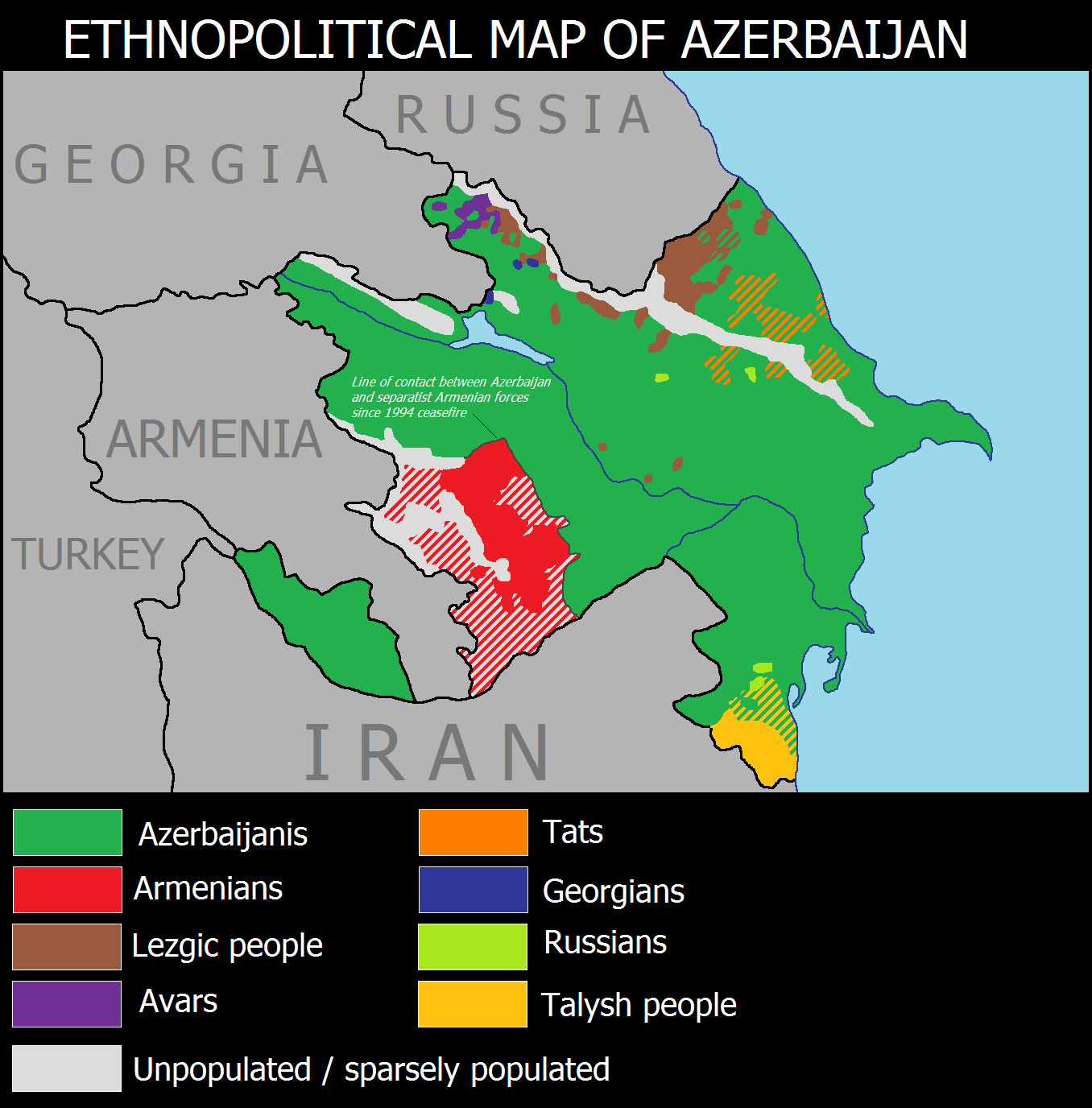
Ethnicities of Azerbaijan (1994-2020, after the First Nagorno-Karabakh War and before the Second Nagorno-Karabakh War).

The primary and official language of Azerbaijan is Azerbaijani, a Turkic language closely related to and partially mutually intelligible with Turkish. Together with Turkish, Turkmen and Gagauz, Azerbaijani is a member of the Oghuz branch of the Turkic languages family.

== Present ==
According to the 2019 census of the country, Azerbaijani is spoken as a native language by 96% of the population, whereas Russian and English play significant roles as languages of education and communication. More than half of Azerbaijani speakers are monolingual. Lezgian, Talysh, Avar, Georgian, Budukh, Juhuri, Khinalug, Kryts, Jek, Rutul, Tsakhur, Tat, and Udi are all spoken by minorities. All the aforementioned languages (except Lezgian, Talysh, Avar, and Georgian, which have far larger numbers of speakers outside Azerbaijan but steadily declining numbers within the country) are considered endangered languages. They are threatened with extinction, as they have few (below 10,000) or very few (below 1,000) speakers and their use continues to decline with emigration and modernization.

According to 2019 research, English language proficiency in Azerbaijan was the lowest among the European countries surveyed.

An entire issue of the International Journal of the Sociology of Language, edited by Jala Garibova, was devoted to the matter of languages and language choices in Azerbaijan, vol. 198 in 2009.

Azerbaijan has not ratified the European Charter for Regional or Minority Languages to which it became a signatory in 1992, under the Popular Front. In 2001, the then President of Azerbaijan Heydar Aliyev issued a statement whereby "the Republic of Azerbaijan is not in the power to guarantee the implementation of the Charter regulations until its territory occupied by the Republic of Armenia is liberated".

== See also ==
- Ancient Azari language
- History of Azerbaijan
