= I Spy (2002 TV series) =

American animated television series

- Based on: I Spy written by Jean Marzollo and photographed by Walter Wick
- Voices of: Tara Jayne; Ellen Lee; Cindy Creekmore; Big Al
- Country of origin: United States
- Original language: English
- No. of seasons: 2
- No. of episodes: 26 (52 segments)

Production
- Executive producer: Deborah Forte
- Producers: Jean Marzollo; Walter Wick
- Running time: 22-24 minutes (2 11–minute segments)
- Production companies: The Ink Tank (season 1); JWL Entertainment Productions (season 2); Scholastic Entertainment

Original release
- Network: HBO Family
- Release: December 14, 2002 – September 21, 2003

I Spy is an American stop-motion and claymation television series that aired on the HBO Family digital pay-TV channel in the United States from December 14, 2002 to September 21, 2003, based on the children's book series created and written by Jean Marzollo and Walter Wick. Produced by The Ink Tank in season 1 and JWL Entertainment Productions in season 2 and Scholastic Entertainment, the show lasted for two seasons and 52 episodes.

== Plot ==
I Spy follows a young boy, Spyler, and his pet dog and best friend, CeCe. Each episode starts off similar, with Spyler and CeCe performing an activity or playing a game, only to discover that they need other items to perform their task. Their friend, Duck, arrives and asks the two what they are up to. They then start a game of I Spy upon Duck hearing that they need to find things. She proceeds to give Spyler and CeCe four (or sometimes three) items to find, which she says in a riddle, before driving off. Spyler and CeCe then start finding for the items, and after each item is found, they sing their "Whoop! We Found It!" song.

After two items are found, Spyler calls for their friend, Wheeler, to take the heavy items they found back home. Duck then appears again and tells them what they have found and the remaining two items they need to find in riddle. After all the items are found, Spyler and CeCe do their activity or game, using every item they found. Each episode also starts with a super challenge game, announced after the episode’s title, involving finding a certain number of a specific object throughout the episode, such as four wingnuts or six triangular blocks.

== Characters ==
- Spyler – Spyler (voiced by Tara Jayne in the US and Lizzie Waterworth-Santo in the UK) is one of the two main characters in I Spy. He is a plasticine clay model, with a tennis ball head, red pipe cleaner hair, green gloves for hands, a pink eraser, and buttons as feet. His name is a portmanteau of the name Skyler and the word “Spy”. Spyler is the voice of reason, making sure that he and CeCe are focused on their task of completing their game of I Spy. In spite of this, Spyler is very fun-loving and loves to play with CeCe and the other toys within his world.
- CeCe – CeCe (voiced by Ellen Lee in the US and Maria Darling in the UK) is Spyler's best friend and pet dog. Like Spyler, she is made of plasticine clay with orange building blocks and yellow and green paper dots on her. CeCe is very silly and energetic, often having jokes for Spyler related to the items in their game of I Spy, though she does have scaredy-cat tendencies. CeCe also has an incredible stomach, often being very hungry during their games, much to Spyler's displeasure. In spite of this, she is always attentive during I Spy and helps out often finding items.
- Duck – Duck (voiced by Cindy Creekmore) is one of Spyler and CeCe's friends. She is a plasticine clay rubber duck on wheels who always starts games of I Spy with her friends, giving them a list of four things to find for Spyler and CeCe in riddle. She comes back after the second item is found to remind them of the remaining items they have left, and often participates in their activities once all four items are found.
- Wheeler – Wheeler (sound effects by Big Al) is a big red dump truck and another of Spyler and CeCe's friends. Unlike other characters, Wheeler does not talk, as he only makes vocalized truck sounds. Wheeler is called upon in every episode to bring the items Spyler and CeCe can use for their activity back home.
- Domino General – The Domino General (sound effects by Big Al) is the leader of the dominoes who has a white mustache in the front of his face. He talks half indistinctly, and can often be found marching with his fellow domino soldiers around the world.
- Mumble Monster – The Mumble Monster (sound effects by Big Al) is a monster that has shaggy yellow fur and wears purple, yellow and blue striped socks. He speaks in a mumble voice, hence the title of his name. Mumble appears throughout the show, first as a spooky tale told by Spyler in A Mumble Monster Mystery as a creature lurking in the forest who eats anyone's raisins upon meeting him. However, after attempting to trap him, Spyler and CeCe find that Mumble is actually very friendly, and soon become friends with him, sometimes including him in their activities.
- Silly Knights - The Silly Knights are four knights who live in a sand castle on the beach. In every episode that features them, they always argue over who is better than the rest of them or who is right, like who is the tallest, who is the best singer, etc.
- Polka and Dot - Polka and Dot are ladybug twin sisters. When Spyler and CeCe come by through the forest during their games, they find that the two have one of the items they need and ask Polka and Dot if they can borrow it after they find it. Polka and Dot say they cannot "borrow" the item, but they can "have" it.
- Clankenspy - Clankenspy is a robot made with a tin-can body, a light bulb head, and a red button on the center of him. He was invented by Spyler and CeCe in "A Runaway Robot" to help them clean up a mess they made at the beginning of the episode. Clankenspy is described as "strong and fast and nice."

== Episodes ==
=== Season 1 (2002–2003) ===
1. A Mumble Monster Picture Day/Clouds Rolled By - (December 14, 2002)
2. A Bike I Like/A Tick-illy Hiccup - (December 15, 2002)
3. A Broom, a Whistle, and a Drum/Sky High - (December 21, 2002)
4. A Runaway Robot/A Little Lost Lamb - (December 22, 2002)
5. A Starry Sky/Circus Things in Three Rings - (December 28, 2002)
6. A Mumble Monster Mystery/CeCe's Special Scrapbook - (December 29, 2002)
7. A Thing That Flings/Seashells by the Seashore - (January 4, 2003)
8. Home Run Fun/A Race in a High-Flying Place - (January 5, 2003)
9. A Mumble Monster Mid-Day Snack/A Polka-Dot Puppet Princess - (January 11, 2003)
10. A Rockin' Bronco/A Wish for a Fish - (January 12, 2003)
11. A Bird I've Heard/A Super Silly Pizza - (January 18, 2003)
12. An Out of Luck Truck/A Kite in Flight - (January 19, 2003)
13. A Campfire Light Night/Freewheelin' Fun - (January 25, 2003)

=== Season 2 (2003) ===
1. A Mumble Movie/A Book Wherever I Look - (June 29, 2003)
2. A Surprise Before Your Eyes/Something Nice for the Mice - (July 6, 2003)
3. A Marble Maze Craze/Toys That Roam - (July 13, 2003)
4. A Rhyme Just in Time/A Toe-Tapping Talent Show - (July 20, 2003)
5. Red She Said/One Quick Magic Trick - (July 27, 2003)
6. A Superhero/A Silly Sleepover - (August 3, 2003)
7. The Case of the Missing Truck/Something Really Cool - (August 10, 2003)
8. The Best Car by Far/Something Fit for a Queen - (August 17, 2003)
9. A Very Merry Musical/A Sled up Ahead! - (August 24, 2003)
10. A Rundown Robot/A Game That's Not the Same - (August 31, 2003)
11. A Dinosaur with a Scritch-Scratch Itch/Fun and a Hole-in-One! - (September 7, 2003)
12. A 'Moo' in Act Two/A Train Back on Track - (September 14, 2003)
13. Fun in the Jungle/A Squeeze For a Sneeze - (September 21, 2003)

== Broadcast ==
The show originally aired on HBO Family on December 14, 2002, as part of its Jam (now HBO Kids) preschool block in the United States until it was removed in July 2011, along with the TV show Harold and The Purple Crayon. Qubo later aired this show from May 18, 2013 until September 25, 2015 along with other Scholastic shows the network aired. The show was also on Hulu until 2017. The show aired on Nick Jr. in the UK in 2003 until 2007. The show aired on ABC, as part of its ABC Kids block in Australia from 2003 to 2004.
