= June 15 =

June 15 this year in various calendars
- Monday, 15 June 2026
Akan	Monodwo
Armenian	30 Margach 1475
Aztec	Teotleco 16, 1 Cuetzpalin
Babylonian	28 Ayaru, 2337 SE
Balinese pawukon	Luang, Pepet, Kajeng, Jaya, Pon, Maulu, Coma of Dunggulan, Kala, Erangan, Pati
Bengali	1 Asharh, BS 1433
Chinese	Yang Metal Monkey・Net Mansion; Fire Horse Year, Month 5, Day 1 (Mangzhong, 6 days until Xiazhi)
Common Era	15 June 2026 CE
Coptic	8 Paoni, AM 1742
Egyptian	30 Phaophi, 2775 NE
Ethiopian	8 Sanē, 2018 Amätä Məhrät
French Republican	Décade III, Septidi de Prairial de l'Année 234 de la République
Gregorian	15 June, AD 2026
Hebrew	30 Sivan, AM 5786
Hindu	Mṛgaśiras・Śūla; Solar: 1 Āṣāḍha, 1948 SE; Lunisolar: Amāvasyā, Kṛishna pakṣa of Adhika Jyeṣṭha, 2083 VE; Rāudra・5127 KY・1,872,741
Icelandic	Mánudagur, 24 Skerpla 2026
Islamic	29 Dhu al-Hijjah, AH 1447 (using tabular method)
ISO week date	2026-W25-1
Japanese	1 Satsuki, Reiwa 8 (Bōshu, 6 days until Geshi)
Julian	2 June, AD 2026 (AM 7534)
Julian day	2461207
Korean	1 Maldal, 4359 DE
Maya	13.0.13.12.4; 17 Zotz, 1 Kan
Roman	ante diem IV Nonas Iunias, MMDCCLXXIX AUC
Solar Hijri	25 Khordad, SH 1405
Tibetan	30 sa ga, me pho rta 2153 or 1772 or 1000

<<	June					>>
Su	Mo	Tu	We	Th	Fr	Sa
	1	2	3	4	5	6
7	8	9	10	11	12	13
14	15	16	17	18	19	20
21	22	23	24	25	26	27
28	29	30
2026

June 15 in recent years
2026 (Monday)
2025 (Sunday)
2024 (Saturday)
2023 (Thursday)
2022 (Wednesday)
2021 (Tuesday)
2020 (Monday)
2019 (Saturday)
2018 (Friday)
2017 (Thursday)

June 15 is the 166th day of the year (167th in leap years) in the Gregorian calendar; 199 days remain until the end of the year.

== Events ==
=== Pre-1600 ===
- 763 BC – Assyrians record a solar eclipse that is later used to fix the chronology of Mesopotamian history.
- 844 – Louis II is crowned as king of Italy at Rome by pope Sergius II.
- 923 – Battle of Soissons: King Robert I of France is killed and King Charles the Simple is arrested by the supporters of Duke Rudolph of Burgundy.
- 1184 – The naval Battle of Fimreite is won by the Birkebeiner pretender Sverre Sigurdsson. Sigurdsson takes the Norwegian throne and King Magnus V of Norway is killed.
- 1215 – King John of England puts his seal to Magna Carta.
- 1219 – Northern Crusades: Danish victory at the Battle of Lindanise (modern-day Tallinn) establishes the Danish Duchy of Estonia.
- 1246 – With the death of Frederick II, Duke of Austria, the Babenberg dynasty ends in Austria.
- 1285 – The Byzantine Empire and the Republic of Venice conclude a treaty. Apart from agreeing on a ten year truce, the Venetians are alloted a commercial quarter in Constantinople and are restored to earlier privileges.
- 1310 – The Tiepolo conspiracy, seeking to seize power in the Republic of Venice, is thwarted after bloody street clashes in Venice. The suppression of the revolt will lead to the creation of the Council of Ten.
- 1312 – At the Battle of Rozgony, King Charles I of Hungary wins a decisive victory over the family of Palatine Amade Aba.
- 1389 – The Ottomans under Sultan Murad I defeat a Serb army under Lazar of Serbia in the battle of Kosovo. Both leaders are killed in the battle.
- 1410 – In a decisive battle at Onon River, the Mongol forces of Oljei Temur were decimated by the Chinese armies of the Yongle Emperor.
- 1410 – Ottoman Interregnum: Süleyman Çelebi defeats his brother Musa Çelebi outside the Byzantine capital, Constantinople.
- 1520 – Pope Leo X threatens to excommunicate Martin Luther in Exsurge Domine.
- 1567 – Mary, Queen of Scots, and her new husband Bothwell are confronted by disgruntled Scottish nobles in the encounter at Carberry Hill. The stand-off ends with the surrender of queen Mary.

=== 1601–1900 ===
- 1607 – Virginia colonists finish building James's Fort, to defend against Spanish and Native American attacks.
- 1804 – New Hampshire approves the Twelfth Amendment to the United States Constitution, ratifying the document.
- 1826 – In the Auspicious Incident, the Janissary mutiny against Sultan Mahmud II is defeated and the Janissary corps is disbanded as a result.
- 1834 – The looting of Safed commences.
- 1846 – The Oregon Treaty extends the border between the United States and British North America, established by the Treaty of 1818, westward to the Pacific Ocean.
- 1859 – Ambiguity in the Oregon Treaty leads to the "Northwestern Boundary Dispute" between American and British/Canadian settlers.
- 1864 – American Civil War: The Second Battle of Petersburg begins.
- 1896 – One of the deadliest tsunamis in Japan's history kills more than 22,000 people.

=== 1901–present ===
- 1904 – A fire aboard the steamboat SS General Slocum in New York City's East River kills 1,000.
- 1919 – John Alcock and Arthur Brown complete the first nonstop transatlantic flight when they reach Clifden, County Galway, Ireland.
- 1920 – Following the 1920 Schleswig plebiscites, Northern Schleswig is transferred from Germany to Denmark.
- 1940 – World War II: Operation Aerial begins: Allied troops start to evacuate France, following Germany's takeover of Paris and most of the nation.
- 1944 – World War II: The United States invades Saipan, capital of Japan's South Seas Mandate.
- 1944 – In the Saskatchewan general election, the CCF, led by Tommy Douglas, is elected and forms the first socialist government in North America.
- 1972 – Cathay Pacific Flight 700Z is destroyed by a bomb over Pleiku, Vietnam (then South Vietnam) and kills 81 people.
- 1977 – After the death of dictator Francisco Franco in 1975, the first democratic elections take place in Spain.
- 1988 – The Ariane 4 rocket is launched on its maiden flight.
- 1991 – In the Philippines, Mount Pinatubo erupts in the second largest volcanic eruption of the 20th century, killing over 800 people.
- 1992 – The United States Supreme Court rules in United States v. Álvarez-Machaín that it is permissible for the United States to forcibly extradite suspects in foreign countries and bring them to the United States for trial, without approval from those other countries.
- 1996 – The Troubles: The Provisional Irish Republican Army (IRA) detonates a powerful truck bomb in the middle of Manchester, England, devastating the city centre and injuring 200 people.
- 2013 – A bomb explodes on a bus in the Pakistani city of Quetta, killing at least 25 people and wounding 22 others.

== Births ==
=== Pre-1600 ===
- 1330 – Edward, the Black Prince of England (died 1376)
- 1479 – Lisa del Giocondo, Italian model, subject of the Mona Lisa (died 1542)
- 1519 – Henry FitzRoy, 1st Duke of Richmond and Somerset, English politician, Lord Lieutenant of Ireland (died 1536)
- 1542 – Richard Grenville, English captain and explorer (died 1591)
- 1549 – Elizabeth Knollys, English noblewoman (died 1605)
- 1553 – Archduke Ernest of Austria (died 1595)

=== 1601–1900 ===
- 1605 – Thomas Randolph, English poet and playwright (died 1635)
- 1623 – Cornelis de Witt, Dutch politician (died 1672)
- 1624 – Hiob Ludolf, German orientalist and philologist (died 1704)
- 1640 – Bernard Lamy, French mathematician and theologian (died 1715)
- 1645 – Sidney Godolphin, 1st Earl of Godolphin, English politician (died 1712)
- 1749 – Georg Joseph Vogler, German organist, composer, and theorist (died 1814)
- 1754 – Juan José Elhuyar, Spanish chemist and mineralogist (died 1796)
- 1755 – Antoine François, comte de Fourcroy, French chemist and entomologist (died 1809)
- 1763 – Franz Danzi, German cellist, composer, and conductor (died 1826)
- 1763 – Kobayashi Issa, Japanese priest and poet (died 1827)
- 1765 – Henry Thomas Colebrooke, English orientalist (died 1837)
- 1767 – Rachel Jackson, American wife of Andrew Jackson (died 1828)
- 1777 – David Daniel Davis, Welsh physician and academic (died 1841)
- 1789 – Josiah Henson, American minister, author, and activist (died 1883)
- 1790 – Charles-Amédée Kohler, Swiss chocolatier (died 1874)
- 1792 – Thomas Mitchell, Scottish-Australian colonel and explorer (died 1855)
- 1801 – Benjamin Wright Raymond, American merchant and politician, 3rd Mayor of Chicago (died 1883)
- 1805 – William B. Ogden, American businessman and politician, 1st Mayor of Chicago (died 1877)
- 1809 – François-Xavier Garneau, Canadian poet and historian (died 1866)
- 1822 – Alfonso Corti, Italian anatomist (died 1876)
- 1835 – Adah Isaacs Menken, American actress, painter, and poet (died 1868)
- 1843 – Edvard Grieg, Norwegian pianist and composer (died 1907)
- 1848 – Gheevarghese Mar Gregorios of Parumala, Indian bishop and saint (died 1902)
- 1872 – Thomas William Burgess, English swimmer and water polo player (died 1950)
- 1875 – Herman Smith-Johannsen, Norwegian-Canadian skier (died 1987)
- 1878 – Margaret Abbott, Indian-American golfer (died 1955)
- 1881 – Kesago Nakajima, Japanese lieutenant general in the Imperial Japanese Army (died 1945)
- 1884 – Harry Langdon, American actor, director, and screenwriter (died 1944)
- 1886 – Frank Clement, British racing driver (died 1970)
- 1888 – Martin D'Arcy, English Jesuit priest (died 1976)
- 1888 – Ramón López Velarde, Mexican poet and author (died 1921)
- 1890 – Georg Wüst, German oceanographer and academic (died 1977)
- 1894 – Robert Russell Bennett, American composer and conductor (died 1981)
- 1894 – Nikolai Chebotaryov, Ukrainian-Russian mathematician and theorist (died 1947)
- 1898 – Hubertus Strughold, German-American physiologist and academic (died 1986)
- 1900 – Gotthard Günther, German philosopher and academic (died 1984)
- 1900 – Otto Luening, German-American composer and conductor (died 1996)

=== 1901–present ===
- 1901 – Elmar Lohk, Russian-Estonian architect (died 1963)
- 1902 – Erik Erikson, German-American psychologist and psychoanalyst (died 1994)
- 1906 – Gordon Welchman, English-American mathematician and author (died 1985)
- 1906 – Léon Degrelle, Belgian SS officer (died 1994)
- 1907 – James Robertson Justice, English actor and educator (died 1975)
- 1909 – Elena Nikolaidi, Greek-American soprano and educator (died 2002)
- 1910 – David Rose, English-American pianist, composer, and conductor (died 1990)
- 1911 – Wilbert Awdry, English author, created The Railway Series, the basis for Thomas the Tank Engine (died 1997)
- 1913 – Tom Adair, American songwriter, composer, and screenwriter (died 1988)
- 1914 – Yuri Andropov, Russian politician (died 1984)
- 1914 – Saul Steinberg, Romanian-American cartoonist (died 1999)
- 1914 – Hilda Terry, American cartoonist (died 2006)
- 1915 – Nini Theilade, Danish ballet dancer, choreographer, and educator (died 2018)
- 1915 – Thomas Huckle Weller, American biologist and virologist, Nobel Prize laureate (died 2008)
- 1916 – Olga Erteszek, Polish-American fashion designer (died 1989)
- 1916 – Horacio Salgán, Argentinian pianist, composer, and conductor (died 2016)
- 1916 – Herbert A. Simon, American political scientist and economist, Nobel Prize laureate (died 2001)
- 1917 – John Fenn, American chemist and academic, Nobel Prize laureate (died 2010)
- 1917 – Michalis Genitsaris, Greek singer-songwriter (died 2005)
- 1917 – Lash LaRue, American actor and producer (died 1996)
- 1918 – François Tombalbaye, Chadian politician, 1st President of Chad (died 1975)
- 1920 – Keith Andrews, American race car driver (died 1957)
- 1920 – Amy Clampitt, American poet (died 1994)
- 1920 – Alla Kazanskaya, Russian actress (died 2008)
- 1920 – Sam Sniderman, Canadian businessman, founded Sam the Record Man (died 2012)
- 1920 – Alberto Sordi, Italian actor, director, and screenwriter (died 2003)
- 1921 – Erroll Garner, American pianist and composer (died 1977)
- 1922 – Jaki Byard, American pianist and composer (died 1999)
- 1923 – Erland Josephson, Swedish actor and director (died 2012)
- 1923 – Ninian Stephen, English-Australian lieutenant, judge, and politician, 20th Governor-General of Australia (died 2017)
- 1924 – Hédi Fried, Swedish author and psychologist (died 2022)
- 1924 – Ezer Weizman, Israeli general and politician, 7th President of Israel (died 2005)
- 1925 – Richard Baker, English journalist and author (died 2018)
- 1925 – Attilâ İlhan, Turkish poet, author, and critic (died 2005)
- 1926 – Alfred Duraiappah, Sri Lankan Tamil lawyer and politician (died 1975)
- 1927 – Ross Andru, American illustrator (died 1993)
- 1927 – Ibn-e-Insha, Indian-Pakistani poet and author (died 1978)
- 1927 – Hugo Pratt, Italian author and illustrator (died 1995)
- 1930 – Miguel Méndez, American author and academic (died 2013)
- 1930 – Marcel Pronovost, Canadian ice hockey player and coach (died 2015)
- 1931 – Joseph Gilbert, English air marshal
- 1932 – David Alliance, Baron Alliance, Iranian-English businessman and politician (died 2025)
- 1932 – Mario Cuomo, American lawyer and politician, 52nd Governor of New York (died 2015)
- 1932 – Zia Fariduddin Dagar, Indian singer (died 2013)
- 1932 – Bernie Faloney, American-Canadian football player and sportscaster (died 1999)
- 1933 – Mohammad-Ali Rajai, Iranian politician, 2nd President of Iran (died 1981)
- 1933 – Predrag Koraksić Corax, Serbian political caricaturist (died 2026)
- 1934 – Ruby Nash Garnett, American R&B singer
- 1936 – William Levada, American cardinal (died 2019)
- 1937 – Pierre Billon, Swiss-Canadian author and screenwriter
- 1937 – Leon Coates, English composer (died 2023)
- 1937 – Ray Coleman, former editor-in-chief of Melody Maker, author of several music biographies (died 1996)
- 1937 – Waylon Jennings, American singer-songwriter and guitarist (died 2002)
- 1938 – Tony Oxley, British free-jazz and avant-garde drummer (died 2023)
- 1938 – Billy Williams, American baseball player and coach
- 1939 – Ward Connerly, American activist and businessman, founded the American Civil Rights Institute
- 1939 – Brian Jacques, British author (died 2011))
- 1941 – Neal Adams, American illustrator (died 2022)
- 1941 – Harry Nilsson, American singer-songwriter (died 1994)
- 1942 – Ian Greenberg, Canadian broadcaster, founded Astral Media (died 2022)
- 1942 – John E. McLaughlin, American diplomat
- 1942 – Peter Norman, Australian sprinter (died 2006)
- 1943 – Johnny Hallyday, French singer and actor (died 2017)
- 1943 – Poul Nyrup Rasmussen, Danish politician, 38th Prime Minister of Denmark
- 1944 – Robert D. Keppel, American police officer and academic (died 2021)
- 1945 – Miriam Defensor Santiago, Filipino judge and politician (died 2016)
- 1945 – Robert Sarah, Guinean cardinal
- 1945 – Lawrence Wilkerson, American colonel
- 1946 – Noddy Holder, English rock singer-songwriter, musician, and actor
- 1946 – John Horner, American paleontologist and academic
- 1946 – Demis Roussos, Egyptian-Greek singer-songwriter and bass player (died 2015)
- 1947 – Alain Aspect, French physicist (Nobel Prize 2022 for experiments with entangled photons)
- 1947 – John Hoagland, American photographer and journalist (died 1984)
- 1948 – Mike Holmgren, American football player and coach
- 1948 – Alan Huckle, English politician and diplomat, Governor of Anguilla
- 1948 – Henry McLeish, Scottish footballer, academic, and politician, 2nd First Minister of Scotland
- 1949 – Dusty Baker, American baseball player and manager
- 1949 – Simon Callow, English actor and director
- 1949 – Russell Hitchcock, Australian singer-songwriter
- 1949 – Jim Varney, American actor, comedian, and screenwriter (died 2000)
- 1950 – Uğur Erdener, Turkish ophthalmologist and professor
- 1950 – Juliana Azumah-Mensah, Ghanaian nurse and politician
- 1950 – Deney Terrio, American choreographer and television host
- 1950 – Lakshmi Mittal, Indian-English businessman
- 1951 – Jane Amsterdam, American magazine and newspaper editor (Manhattan, inc., New York Post)
- 1951 – Vance A. Larson, American painter (died 2000)
- 1951 – John Redwood, English politician, Secretary of State for Wales
- 1951 – Steve Walsh, American rock singer-songwriter and musician
- 1952 – Satya Pal Jain, Indian lawyer and politician, Additional Solicitor General of India
- 1953 – Vilma Bardauskienė, Lithuanian long jumper
- 1953 – Eje Elgh, Swedish racing driver and sportscaster
- 1953 – Xi Jinping, Chinese engineer and politician, General Secretary of the Communist Party and President of China
- 1953 – Raphael Wallfisch, English cellist and educator
- 1954 – Jim Belushi, American actor
- 1954 – Terri Gibbs, American country music singer and keyboard player
- 1954 – Paul Rusesabagina, Rwandan humanitarian
- 1954 – Zdeňka Šilhavá, Czech discus thrower and shot putter
- 1954 – Beverley Whitfield, Australian swimmer (died 1996)
- 1955 – Polly Draper, American actress, producer, and screenwriter
- 1955 – Julie Hagerty, American model and actress
- 1956 – Yevgeny Kiselyov, Russian-Ukrainian journalist
- 1956 – Lance Parrish, American baseball player, coach, and manager
- 1957 – Brett Butler, American baseball player and coach
- 1958 – Wade Boggs, American baseball player
- 1958 – Riccardo Paletti, Italian racing driver (died 1982)
- 1959 – Alan Brazil, Scottish footballer and sportscaster
- 1959 – Eileen Davidson, American model and actress
- 1960 – Michèle Laroque, French actress, producer, and screenwriter
- 1960 – Marieke van Doorn, Dutch field hockey player and coach
- 1961 – Dave McAuley, Northern Irish boxer and sportscaster
- 1961 – Scott Norton, American wrestler
- 1962 – Brad Armstrong, American wrestler (died 2012)
- 1962 – Chris Morris, English actor, satirist, director, and producer
- 1962 – Andrea Rost, Hungarian soprano
- 1963 – Mario Gosselin, Canadian ice hockey player and sportscaster
- 1963 – Helen Hunt, American actress, director, and producer
- 1963 – Lourdes Valera, Venezuelan actress (died 2012)
- 1964 – Courteney Cox, American actress and producer
- 1964 – Michael Laudrup, Danish footballer and manager
- 1965 – Annelies Bredael, Belgian rower
- 1965 – Karim Massimov, Kazakhstani politician, 7th Prime Minister of Kazakhstan
- 1965 – Adam Smith, American lawyer and politician
- 1966 – Raimonds Vējonis, Latvian politician, 9th President of Latvia
- 1968 – Károly Güttler, Hungarian swimmer
- 1969 – Jesse Bélanger, Canadian ice hockey player
- 1969 – Ice Cube, American rapper, producer, and actor
- 1969 – Idalis DeLeón, American singer and actress
- 1969 – Nasos Galakteros, Greek basketball player
- 1969 – Oliver Kahn, German footballer and sportscaster
- 1969 – Maurice Odumbe, Kenyan cricketer
- 1969 – Cédric Pioline, French tennis player
- 1970 – Christian Bauman, American soldier and author
- 1970 – David Bayssari, Australian rugby league player
- 1970 – Gaëlle Méchaly, French soprano
- 1970 – Leah Remini, American actress and producer
- 1970 – Žan Tabak, Croatian basketball player and coach
- 1971 – Christos Myriounis, Greek basketball player
- 1971 – Jake Busey, American actor, musician, and film producer
- 1972 – Justin Leonard, American golfer
- 1972 – Andy Pettitte, American baseball player
- 1973 – Tore Andre Flo, Norwegian footballer and coach
- 1973 – Neil Patrick Harris, American actor and singer
- 1973 – Pia Miranda, Australian actress
- 1973 – Greg Vaughan, American actor and model
- 1976 – Jiří Ryba, Czech decathlete
- 1977 – Michael Doleac, American basketball player and manager
- 1978 – Wilfred Bouma, Dutch footballer
- 1978 – Zach Day, American baseball player
- 1979 – Yulia Nestsiarenka, Belarusian sprinter
- 1979 – Christian Rahn, German footballer
- 1979 – Charles Zwolsman Jr., Dutch racing driver
- 1980 – David Lyons, Australian rugby player
- 1981 – John Paintsil, Ghanaian footballer
- 1982 – Mike Delany, New Zealand rugby player
- 1982 – Abdur Razzak, Bangladeshi cricketer
- 1983 – Laura Imbruglia, Australian singer-songwriter and guitarist
- 1983 – Josh McGuire, Canadian fencer
- 1984 – Luke Hodge, Australian footballer
- 1984 – Eva Hrdinová, Czech tennis player
- 1984 – Tim Lincecum, American baseball player
- 1984 – Edison Toloza, Colombian footballer
- 1985 – Ashley Nicole Black, American comedian, actress, and writer
- 1986 – James Maloney, Australian rugby league player
- 1986 – Trevor Plouffe, American baseball player
- 1989 – Bayley, American wrestler
- 1989 – Víctor Cabedo, Spanish cyclist (died 2012)
- 1989 – Bryan Clauson, American race car driver (died 2016)
- 1989 – Lewis Hancox, English graphic novelist, social media personality and filmmaker
- 1991 – Jessie Ennis, American actress, director, and writer
- 1992 – Michał Kopczyński, Polish footballer
- 1992 – Mohamed Salah, Egyptian footballer
- 1992 – Dafne Schippers, Dutch heptathlete and sprinter
- 1993 – Cooper Kupp, American football player
- 1993 – Irfan Hadžić, Bosnian footballer
- 1994 – Iñaki Williams, Basque-Ghanaian footballer
- 1996 – Aurora, Norwegian singer-songwriter
- 1996 – Tia-Adana Belle, Barbadian athlete
- 1996 – Hoshi, South Korean singer and dancer
- 1997 – Madison Kocian, American gymnast
- 1999 – Yeosang, South Korean singer and dancer
- 2003 – Pablo Barrios, Spanish footballer

== Deaths ==
=== Pre-1600 ===
- 923 – Robert I of France (born 866)
- 948 – Romanos I Lekapenos, Byzantine Emperor (born c. 870)
- 952 – Murong Yanchao, Chinese general
- 960 – Eadburh of Winchester, English princess and saint
- 970 – Adalbert, bishop of Passau
- 991 – Theophanu, Byzantine wife of Otto II, Holy Roman Emperor (born 960)
- 1073 – Emperor Go-Sanjō of Japan (born 1034)
- 1184 – Magnus Erlingsson, King of Norway (born 1156)
- 1189 – Minamoto no Yoshitsune, Japanese general (born 1159)
- 1246 – Frederick II, Duke of Austria (born 1219)
- 1337 – Angelo da Clareno, Italian Franciscan and leader of a group of Fraticelli (born 1247)
- 1341 – Andronikos III Palaiologos, Byzantine emperor (born 1297)
- 1381 – John Cavendish, English lawyer and judge (born 1346)
- 1381 – Wat Tyler, English rebel leader (born 1341)
- 1383 – John VI Kantakouzenos, Byzantine emperor (born 1292)
- 1383 – Matthew Kantakouzenos, Byzantine emperor
- 1389 – Lazar of Serbia (born 1329)
- 1389 – Murad I, Ottoman Sultan (born 1319)
- 1389 – Miloš Obilić, Serbian knight.
- 1416 – John, Duke of Berry (born 1340)
- 1467 – Philip III, Duke of Burgundy (born 1396)
- 1521 – Tamás Bakócz, Hungarian cardinal (born 1442)

=== 1601–1900 ===
- 1614 – Henry Howard, 1st Earl of Northampton, English courtier and politician, Lord Warden of the Cinque Ports (born 1540)
- 1724 – Henry Sacheverell, English minister and politician (born 1674)
- 1768 – James Short, Scottish mathematician and optician (born 1710)
- 1772 – Louis-Claude Daquin, French organist and composer (born 1694)
- 1844 – Thomas Campbell, Scottish poet and academic (born 1777)
- 1849 – James K. Polk, American lawyer and politician, 11th President of the United States (born 1795)
- 1858 – Ary Scheffer, Dutch-French painter and academic (born 1795)
- 1881 – Franjo Krežma, Croatian violinist and composer (born 1862)
- 1888 – Frederick III, German Emperor (born 1831)
- 1889 – Mihai Eminescu, Romanian journalist, author, and poet (born 1850)
- 1890 – Unryū Kyūkichi, Japanese sumo wrestler, the 10th Yokozuna (born 1822)

=== 1901–present ===
- 1917 – Kristian Birkeland, Norwegian physicist and academic (born 1867)
- 1934 – Alfred Bruneau, French cellist and composer (born 1857)
- 1938 – Ernst Ludwig Kirchner, German painter and illustrator (born 1880)
- 1941 – Otfrid Foerster, German neurologist and physician (born 1873)
- 1941 – Evelyn Underhill, English mystic and author (born 1875)
- 1945 – Count Albert von Mensdorff-Pouilly-Dietrichstein, Austrian diplomat
- 1949 – Frank Elbridge Webb, American engineer and presidential candidate (born 1869)
- 1961 – Giulio Cabianca, Italian racing driver (born 1923)
- 1961 – Peyami Safa, Turkish journalist and author (born 1899)
- 1962 – Alfred Cortot, Swiss pianist and conductor (born 1877)
- 1967 – Tatu Kolehmainen, Finnish runner (born 1885)
- 1968 – Sam Crawford, American baseball player, coach, and umpire (born 1880)
- 1968 – Wes Montgomery, American guitarist and songwriter (born 1925)
- 1971 – Wendell Meredith Stanley, American biochemist and virologist, Nobel Prize laureate (born 1904)
- 1976 – Jimmy Dykes, American baseball player, coach, and manager (born 1896)
- 1984 – Meredith Willson, American playwright, composer, and conductor (born 1902)
- 1985 – Andy Stanfield, American sprinter (born 1927)
- 1989 – Maurice Bellemare, Canadian lawyer and politician (born 1912)
- 1989 – Ray McAnally, Irish actor (born 1926)
- 1991 – Happy Chandler, American businessman and politician, 49th Governor of Kentucky (born 1898)
- 1991 – Arthur Lewis, Saint Lucian economist and academic, Nobel Prize laureate (born 1915)
- 1992 – Chuck Menville, American animator, producer, and screenwriter (born 1940)
- 1992 – Brett Whiteley, Australian painter (born 1939)
- 1993 – John Connally, American commander, lawyer, and politician, 61st United States Secretary of the Treasury (born 1917)
- 1993 – James Hunt, English racing driver and sportscaster (born 1947)
- 1994 – Manos Hatzidakis, Greek composer and theorist (born 1925)
- 1995 – John Vincent Atanasoff, American physicist and inventor, invented the Atanasoff–Berry computer (born 1903)
- 1996 – Ella Fitzgerald, American singer and actress (born 1917)
- 1996 – Sir Fitzroy Maclean, 1st Baronet, Scottish general and politician (born 1911)
- 1996 – Dick Murdoch, American wrestler (born 1946)
- 1999 – Omer Côté, Canadian lawyer and politician (born 1906)
- 2000 – Jules Roy, French author, poet, and playwright (born 1907)
- 2001 – Henri Alekan, French cinematographer (born 1909)
- 2002 – Choi Hong Hi, South Korean general and martial artist, founded Taekwondo (born 1918)
- 2003 – Hume Cronyn, Canadian-American actor (born 1911)
- 2004 – Ahmet Piriştina, Turkish politician and mayor of İzmir (born 1952)
- 2005 – Suzanne Flon, French actress (born 1918)
- 2006 – Raymond Devos, Belgian-French comedian and clown (born 1922)
- 2006 – Herb Pearson, New Zealand cricketer (born 1910)
- 2007 – Hugo Corro, Argentine boxer (born 1953)
- 2008 – Ray Getliffe, Canadian ice hockey player (born 1914)
- 2011 – Bill Haast, American herpetologist and academic (born 1910)
- 2012 – Phillip D. Cagan, American economist and author (born 1927)
- 2012 – Barry MacKay, American tennis player and sportscaster (born 1935)
- 2012 – Israel Nogueda Otero, Mexican economist and politician, 10th Governor of Guerrero (born 1935)
- 2012 – Jerry Tubbs, American football player and coach (born 1935)
- 2013 – Heinz Flohe, German footballer and manager (born 1948)
- 2013 – José Froilán González, Argentinian racing driver (born 1922)
- 2013 – Dennis O'Rourke, Australian director and producer (born 1945)
- 2013 – Kenneth G. Wilson, American physicist and academic, Nobel Prize laureate (born 1936)
- 2014 – Jacques Bergerac, French actor and businessman (born 1927)
- 2019 – Franco Zeffirelli, Italian film director (born 1923)
- 2023 – Glenda Jackson, English actress and politician (born 1936)
- 2024 – James Kent, American chef (born 1979)
- 2024 – Matija Sarkic, English-born Montenegrin footballer (born 1997)

== Holidays and observances ==
- Arbor Day (Costa Rica)
- Christian feast day:
  - Abraham of Clermont (or of St Cyriacus)
  - Alice (or Adelaide) of Schaerbeek
  - Amos
  - Blessed Albertina Berkenbrock
  - Blessed Clement Vismara
  - Edburga of Winchester
  - Evelyn Underhill (Church of England and The Episcopal Church)
  - Germaine Cousin
  - Landelin (of Crespin or of Lobbes)
  - Blessed Peter Snow
  - Trillo
  - Vitus (Guy), Modestus and Crescentia
  - June 15 (Eastern Orthodox liturgics)
- Day of Valdemar and Reunion Day (Flag Day) (Denmark)
- Engineer's Day (Italy)
- Global Wind Day (international)
- National Beer Day (United Kingdom)
- National Salvation Day (Azerbaijan)
