= I Spy Spooky Mansion =

1999 puzzle video game

- PC CD-ROM cover art
- Developers: Black Hammer Productions (PC); Gusto Games (Wii)
- Publisher: Scholastic
- Series: I Spy
- Platforms: Windows, Mac OS, Mac OS X, iPhone OS, Wii
- Release: Windows; September 7, 1999 (original); September 12, 2004 (Deluxe); Mac OS; September 7, 1999 iPhone OS; September 3, 2009; Wii; October 2010
- Genre: Puzzle
- Modes: Single-player, multiplayer (Wii)

I Spy Spooky Mansion is a point-and-click puzzle game developed by Black Hammer Productions and published by Scholastic in 1999 based on the I Spy children's books.

== Gameplay and Plot ==
In the game, the player starts at the entrance of a haunted mansion. They enter and are locked inside. The "Guide", a skeleton known as Skelly (voiced by Amy Birnbaum) informs the player that they must earn puzzle pieces to escape the house. They search various areas in the mansion for hidden objects or words specified at the bottom of the screen. Once all of the items in an area have been found, Skelly appears and awards the player with a puzzle piece. When the player has collected 15 puzzle pieces, they may combine them inside a picture frame to obtain instructions leading to Skelly's secret study in the library.

Following Skelly's instructions, the player pulls on three books in the order of blue, green, then red. This causes the head on the bookshelf to move, unlocking the secret entrance to Skelly's study. The player can then escape through the window by climbing down a rope with Skelly, taking them back to the front entrance of the mansion. The player is then invited back into the house for more I Spy riddles. From there, the player must find the ingredients to Skelly's favorite recipe: Shrinking Soup.

Once the player fetches all of the ingredients, they are able to eat it and escape the mansion through a mousehole by the front door. This hole takes the player back to the front entrance of the mansion, where Skelly invites the player into the house for a final game of riddles. To escape for a third time, the player must collect all of the parts to fix Skelly's ghost machine. Once the machine is repaired, the player creates ghosts from various objects inside the mansion. After creating six ghosts, the seventh and final ghost is revealed. Skelly crawls into the machine to turn into a ghost called the "Get-Out Ghost". The "Get-Out Ghost" propels the player out of the mansion through the chimney. Having finally escaped, Skelly congratulates the player and the game ends.

== Other releases ==
Scholastic released a "Deluxe" version on September 12, 2004, released another version on the iPhone on September 3, 2009, and released a 3D version on the Wii on October 14, 2010. The new releases of the game expand on the original in many ways, by adding an additional story after the secret message is uncovered, and adding additional rooms. They boast 33 I Spy riddles, however many of these riddles have the player revisiting previous stages multiple times. The Wii version of the game was developed by Gusto Games and features gameplay similar to Ultimate I Spy, as well as multiplayer support.

== Reception ==
Reception
I Spy Spooky Mansion

Aggregate score
Aggregator	Score
GameRankings	(Wii) 56%

Review scores
Publication	Score
Nintendo Life	(Wii) 7/10
Metzomagic	(PC) 4/5

I Spy Spooky Mansion: Deluxe

Review scores
Publication	Score
PCMag	(PC) 4/5
EdutainingKids.com	(PC/Mac) A

Reviewing the PC Deluxe version, Carol Ellison of PCMAG found the "fun factor [was] powerful" and that parents would enjoy themselves "as much as the kids".

Review aggregator GameRankings gave the Nintendo Wii version of the game 56%, based on four reviews. Reviewing that version for Nintendo Life, Zach Kaplan thought that while it served its target audience fine enough, "adult seek-and-find experience should look elsewhere". He was also critical of the graphics and the atmosphere of the game.
