= Borders of Azerbaijan =

Political boundaries between Azerbaijan and neighboring territories

Borders of Azerbaijan

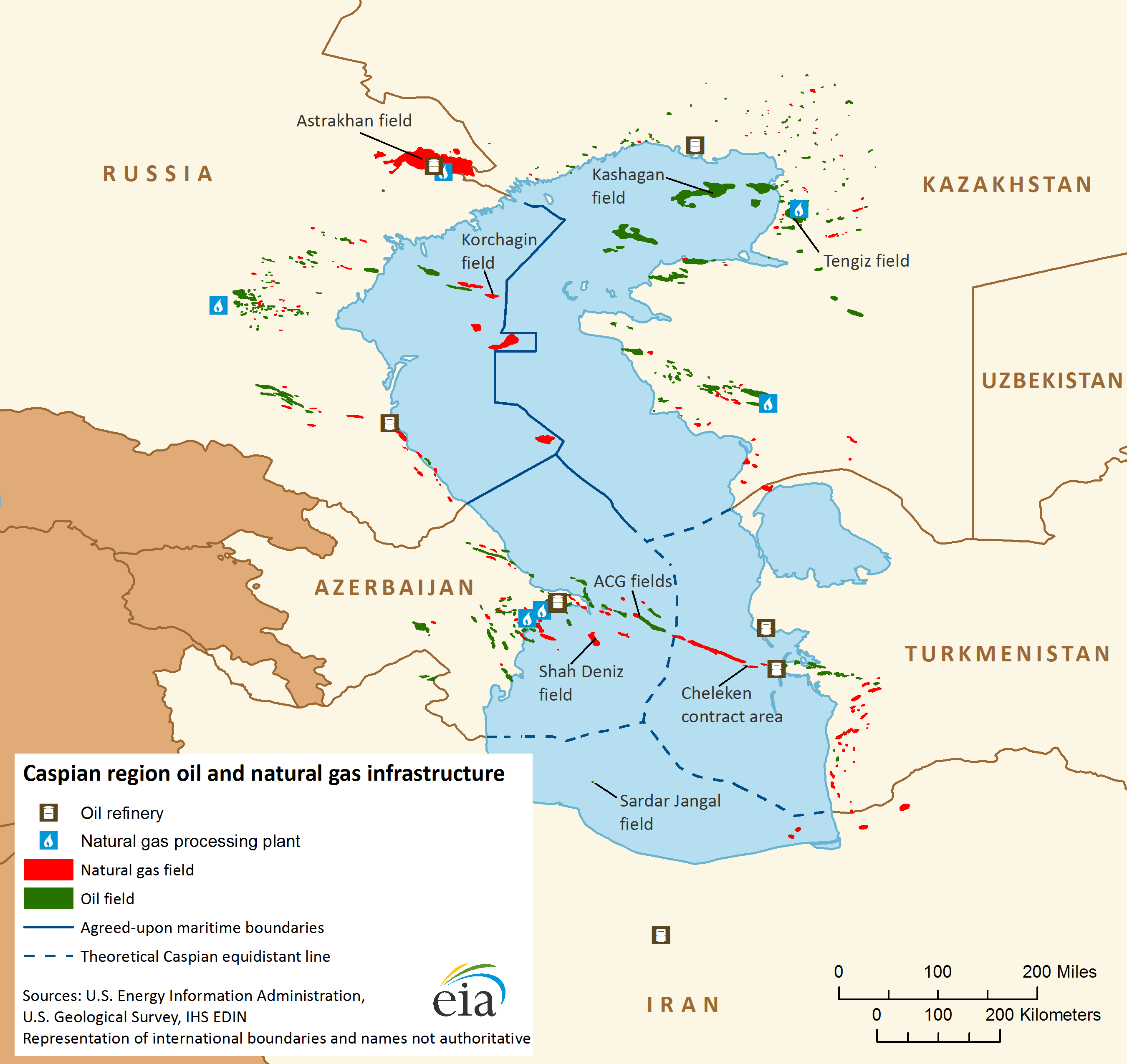
Fixed and undetermined hypothetical maritime borders in the Caspian Sea

Azerbaijan has land and maritime borders with five countries: Russia to the north, Georgia to the northwest, Iran to the south, Turkey to the west (via the Azerbaijani exclave of Nakhchivan to the northwest) and Armenia to the west and via the Azerbaijani exclave of Nakhchivan to the north and east. To the east, Azerbaijan is bordered by the Caspian Sea which is classified as the world's largest lake and also as a closed sea.

Additionally, in Armenia, there exist three Azerbaijani enclaves: Barxudarlı, Yuxarı Əskipara and Karki (located north of the region of Nakhchivan) Reciprocally, there exists one Armenian enclave, a village called Artsvashen in north-western Azerbaijan.

Although as a landlocked country Azerbaijan has no access to the open sea (hence the ocean), it has a coastline of 713 km (443 mi) on the Caspian Sea, which is a lake or a closed sea depending on various definitions and interpretations. Because of its large size and being bordered by five countries, it has (still partially undefined) maritime borders and naval forces by all five Caspian littoral states. Azerbaijan's maritime boundaries with Russia and Kazakhstan have been determined, but the boundaries with Iran and Turkmenistan are still disputed.

Since March 2020 and due initially to the COVID-19 pandemic, all land borders of Azerbaijan remain closed, which has been extended every six months. However, cargo from Georgia, Russia, Iran, and Turkey has continued to be allowed to enter and leave Azerbaijan by land.

== Land borders ==
Table of countries with a land border with Azerbaijan.

#	Country	Length (km)	More information
1	Armenia	1,007 km (626 mi) (Note: 221 km (137 mi) on the border with Nakhchivan.)	Armenia–Azerbaijan border
2	Iran	765 km (475 mi) (Note: 179 km (111 mi) on the border with Nakhchivan.)	Azerbaijan–Iran border
3	Georgia	480 km (300 mi)	Azerbaijan–Georgia border
4	Russia	390 km (240 mi)	Azerbaijan–Russia border
5	Turkey	11 km (6.8 mi) (Note: All on the border with Nakhchivan.)	Azerbaijan–Turkey border
Total		2,650 km (1,650 mi)	

== See also ==
- State Border Service (Azerbaijan)
- Border crossings of Azerbaijan
