= Ken Davies (artist) =

American painter (1925–2017)

Kenneth Davies
- Born: December 20, 1925; New Bedford, Massachusetts, U.S.
- Died: December 24, 2017 (aged 92); Madison, Connecticut, U.S.
- Spouse: Maryann Davies
- Website: kendaviesart.com

Kenneth Davies (December 20, 1925 - December 24, 2017) was an American painter based in Madison, Connecticut, known for his trompe-l'œil work.

Ken Davies was born in New Bedford, Massachusetts. He attended Yale University, where he painted his first important oil painting, "Lighthouses in the Alps". The work captured the attention of New York City cultural figure Lincoln Kirstein, who helped Davies attain showings of his early works in 1950 at the Hewitt Gallery. He also received a Louis Comfort Tiffany Foundation fellowship that year. His first solo show was at the Hewitt Gallery in 1951, and every painting sold.

He taught at the Paier School of Art in Hamden, Connecticut. During his forty years there, he taught such notable artists as Joseph Reboli; and eventually became the dean. In 1962, he decided to refocus on his Still life painting, and enjoyed further success, with gallery representation from Hirschl & Adler Galleries. His first solo show there was in 1978.

Davies' labor-intensive technique involves sable brushes, resulting in paintings that appear almost like photographs, but with trompe-l'œil and Surrealist effects.
