= Guy Stanley Philoche =

Haitian-American realist artist (born 1977)

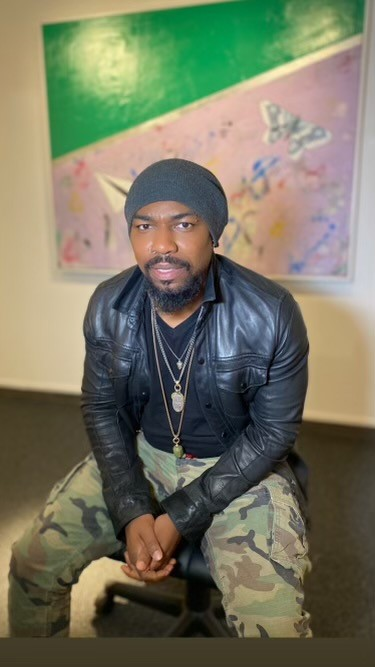
- Philoche in front of one of his works at Cavalier Gallery.
- Born: 1977 (age 48–49); Haiti
- Style: Paintings and Sculpture
- Website: www.philochestudios.com

Guy Stanley Philoche (/ɡaɪ ˈstænli fɪloʊʃ/; French pronunciation: [ɡi stanlɛ filɔʃ]) (born 1977) is a Haitian-American abstract realist artist known for his colourful, richly-textured paintings often blending themes and images of New York City and the Caribbean while also incorporating elements of nostalgia through use of cartoon and comic characters. Born in Haiti, Philoche has spent most of his life in the United States, at first in Connecticut and later on in New York City, his present home. In 2020, Philoche came to national attention when his efforts to provide assistance and support for struggling artists were highlighted in news sources throughout the United States.

== Biography ==
Guy Stanley Philoche was born in Haiti in 1977. In 1980, when he was three years old, his family immigrated to the United States, settling in Connecticut. When Philoche's family first arrived in the United States, the family faced extreme poverty, and Guy himself found it difficult to adjust to a new country and a new language. Guy spoke French, and he learned English through watching cartoons and reading comics. Despite these difficulties, Philoche's childhood was happy. His fond memories of the board games he and his family played every Sunday after dinner were the inspiration for an entire series of Philoche's paintings, entitled the Game Series. His first drawings were of Disney characters, whom he still reproduces in his paintings. All of these childhood experiences were a major influence on Philoche's life and art.

One of three brothers, Philoche was the only member of the family not to pursue a traditional career path. Instead, his drawings of Disney characters and visits to museums (especially a visit to an art museum in the Third Grade), led Philoche to the realisation that he wanted to be an artist. Philoche left home after high school to start his formal education as an artist. Against the wishes of his family, he attended the Paier College of Art, and later given an honorary doctorate in Philosophy in Fine Arts, where he supported himself by working during his studies. Afterwards, Philoche attended the Yale University School of Art.

Around 2000, Philoche relocated from Connecticut to New York City with the contents of a backpack as his only possessions. Philoche still lives and works in the City today. It was in New York that Philoche's career as a professional artist began.

== Artistic career ==
Philoche struggled in his early years as a new artist in New York City before finally establishing himself and creating several diverse series of works.

When he first arrived in New York, Philoche faced difficulty standing out among the city's many artists. Philoche went from gallery to gallery, leaving his business card under doors and soliciting galleries to take a chance on his work, in addition to sneaking into events in order to meet potential clients. By 2016, however, Philoche had established himself in the New York art scene as a known and respected artist.

Philoche's earliest works were more abstract expressionist, though exhibiting the thickly-painted textures for which he is now known. These were part of a painting series known as the Untitled Series, which Philoche described as "Rothko, only sexier."

After a visit to his brother, where the two reminisced about playing board games together as children, Philoche began his ‘’Game Series’’. This was his second series of paintings, many of which incorporated different parts of the Monopoly board game, which he represented as distressed scenes, so that together, the works represent snapshots of the well-worn Monopoly set the artist’s family played every Sunday.

In 2012, Philoche created his ‘’No Comment Series’’, a series of female nude paintings focusing on sexual violence against women as well as domestic abuse and sexism in the workplace and everyday society. Philoche offered the series to galleries throughout New York, but each gallery deemed the subject too controversial to show.

Philoche began his signature style of nostalgic works with his Freedom series in Spring 2016. These paintings combined the distressed, vintage appearance of Philoche’s Games Series with the paper airplanes and colour fields of his later works. The paper airplanes, which Philoche tossed out windows as a child, are a recurring theme in his work.

In 2019, Philoche debuted his Come Fly With Me series. This series again invokes the nostalgia of Philoche’s childhood with images of dollar bills folded into butterflies and airplanes in reference to a memory of Philoche’s father giving the artist a wallet with a lucky $2 bill. The scenes in these paintings included $100 bills as paper airplanes, with the intention of removing the currency from its value-based context against backgrounds meant to evoke aged New York City walls.

In 2020, Philoche joined a group of Harlem artists in creating a two-block Black Lives Matter mural across Adam Clayton Powell Jr. Boulevard in honour of George Floyd and the Black Lives Matter movement. In the mural, Philoche represented the "I" and the "V" in "Lives" with the I showing the four badge numbers of the Minneapolis police officers involved, and the V simply showing "8:46", representing the 8 minutes and 46 seconds it was initially believed that Derek Chauvin had knelt on Floyd's neck. Taking part in producing the mural had a major impact on Philoche, he said of it,

"I think that was probably one of the most amazing experiences in my life. People sat there, people cried, people touched it, people stood on it, people photographed it. I think that was probably one of the most important works I've ever done in my career so far. To actually witness it, to see a little girl stand on your two letters and put her fist up and take a picture… It was just powerful,"

Also, in 2020, as a result of the MeToo Movement, Philoche was able to exhibit his No Comment Series, with the formerly-controversial series now being called "ahead of its time" by many of the galleries that had earlier rejected it.

His latest series 'Give Us Our Flowers', dedicated to the passing of a friend, blossomed into a series celebrating some past and present lives of marginal under represented figures. "These works show strength, resilience in families that are rarely celebrated". The intention is to celebrate and give recognition everyday while living and not wait until it's too late. This body of work is a heartfelt expression of gratitude, that challenges the norm of celebrating individuals.

Philoche has exhibited in galleries throughout the United States. He is currently represented by Cavalier Galleries with locations in Greenwich, CT, New York, NY, Nantucket, MA and Palm Beach, FL. Philoche's works are held in public and private collections including those of Dorinda Medley of "Real Housewives of New York City," Uma Thurman, George Clooney, Merrill Lynch, Deutsche Bank, Barclay Investments, and Google.

== Style and influences ==
Philoche's works incorporate a wide of styles including abstract realism, pop art, and abstract expressionism. His style has changed from his earliest work to his later works, changing from fully abstract to more representational, while adopting its own character. His work has been compared to that of Haitian-Puerto Rican artist Jean-Michel Basquiat as well as that of Barnett Newman, Mark Rothko, and Andy Warhol. Philoche's art incorporates different styles including abstraction, realism, abstract expressionism, and pop art.

Philoche based the Untitled Series on the work of Mark Rothko, with heavily textured abstract expressionist pieces similar to Rothko's. In fact, Philoche has stated "my ultimate goal is to be on the fifth floor of the MoMA next to a Rothko." A hallmark of Philoche's works since this series has also been a worn, gritty look meant to mimic faded New York City walls. The worn appearance is one of several signature elements Philoche incorporates into his works along with fields of solid colour that almost always have a diagonal silver line meant to divide the work between order and chaos; airplanes and butterflies made from lined paper or money; and Post No Bills flyers that are endemic to New York City.

== Philanthropy ==
Philoche regularly engages in philanthropy through art, both by purchasing the work of emerging artists and through anonymous donations of his art on the streets of New York, which he refers to as Art for the People. In one instance, Philoche gave away a $110,000 painting in Harlem, just by leaving it on a street corner.

Recalling his own early struggles, Philoche regularly purchases work from emerging and fellow artists. Whenever he sells a painting or holds a successful exhibition, Philoche makes sure to purchase the work of another artist. He said:

"Art saved my life, […] I owe a debt that I could never pay. If I ever became successful, I would support art and become a benefactor."

Philoche regularly assists charitable organizations through donations of his artwork as well as his direct participation in their activities.

In partnership with the Fairfield Comedy Club as part of Van's Foot the Bill Initiative, Philoche designed a pair of limited-edition Classic Slip-On Vans and a t-shirt, adorned with icons he frequently uses in his paintings, including his rEVOLution symbol alongside his signature paper airplane. Proceeds from the sales were donated to comedians who have lost their jobs because of the pandemic. Through the initiative, Philoche and the comedy club were able to raise upwards of $10,000 for local comedians.

During the COVID-19 Pandemic of 2020, Philoche expanded his efforts by supporting struggling artists including those without any sales history. Half of the artists from whom he purchased were New York-based and known to Philoche. However, he has also solicited purchases from artists as far away as London and Australia. Known as The Philoche Collection, Philoche assembled a diverse array of works which adorn the walls of his small New York apartment.

A major motivation for this was Philoche's own experience trying to make a name for himself as an emerging artist and a desire to make the experience easier for other emerging artists. Word of Philoche's philanthropy has reached emerging artists and collectors alike, influencing the latter to invest in his collecting project. This led to previously unexhibited artists securing future group exhibitions of their work.

Philoche plans to bring as many artists from the collection to the public as possible, and in June 2021, hosted the first public exhibition featuring works from the collection at the Virgil Catherine Gallery in Chicago, IL.
