= State Border Service of Azerbaijan =

State Border Service of Azerbaijan Republic Azərbaycan Respublikası Dövlət Sərhəd Xidməti
- Racing Stripe

- Seal of the State Border Service of Azerbaijan

- Banner of the State Border Service of Azerbaijan
- Abbreviation: SBS

Agency overview
- Formed: July 31, 2002; 24 years ago
- Preceding agency: Azerbaijan Border Guard Forces

Jurisdictional structure
- Operations jurisdiction: Azerbaijan
- Constituting instrument: Law of Azerbaijan Republic on Border Troops, 1994
- Specialist jurisdictions: National border patrol, security, integrity; Coastal patrol, marine border protection, marine search and rescue

Operational structure
- Headquarters: Baku, Azerbaijan
- Agency executive: Elchin Guliyev, Chief of State Border Service
- Child agency: Academy of State Border Troops

Notables
- Anniversary: 18 August, Day of the Border Guard

Website
- www.dsx.gov.az

The State Border Service of Azerbaijan Republic (SBS; Azerbaijani: Azərbaycan Respublikası Dövlət Sərhəd Xidməti) is a governmental law enforcement agency in charge of protecting the borders of Azerbaijan. The Chief of State Border Service is Colonel-General Elchin Guliyev. Other law enforcement bodies in Azerbaijan include the Internal Troops of Azerbaijan and the Azerbaijani National Guard.

== Objectives ==
The major objectives of the State Border Service of Azerbaijan are to protect the state border of the republic, fight against international terrorism, illegal migration and human trafficking, smuggling, drug trafficking, the proliferation of components of weapons of mass destruction, protection of oil and gas platforms and pipelines in the Azerbaijani sector of the Caspian Sea. Furthermore, it is one of the main duties of State Border Service of Azerbaijan to overcome military attacks of troops or criminal groups of foreign countries to the territory of Azerbaijan Republic, protects people, state property, private property from those military and other actions and prevents this kind of actions.

== History ==
Legislation on Border Troops includes the Constitution of Azerbaijan, present law, and other legislative acts, on top of decrees of the President, resolutions of the Cabinet of Ministers, and international and intergovernmental treaties. The Law of the Republic of Azerbaijan "On Border Troops" was adopted on January 6, 1994. According to these laws, the State Border Service (SBS) is responsible for the security and protection of the borders of Azerbaijan. At the time, the border troops were part of the Ministry of National Security of Azerbaijan. The State Border Service of Azerbaijan was established on July 31, 2002 by decree of the President of Azerbaijan Heydar Aliyev, by the removal of the border troops from jurisdiction of the Ministry of National Security. Every year since 2000, 18 August has been celebrated as the Day of the Border Guard, commemorating the parliament on 18 August 1918 signing a decree "On the protection of the state border of the Republic of Azerbaijan" and a law "On the establishment of border customs protection in the Republic of Azerbaijan."

On 15 June 2019, in honor of the National Salvation Day of Azerbaijanis, the SBS organized a procession with a 100 m-long (330 ft) flag of Azerbaijan. More than 5,000 border guards carried the Flag of Azerbaijan on their shoulders. They were escorted by border guard riders on Karabakh horses, armored fighting vehicles and 8 helicopters.

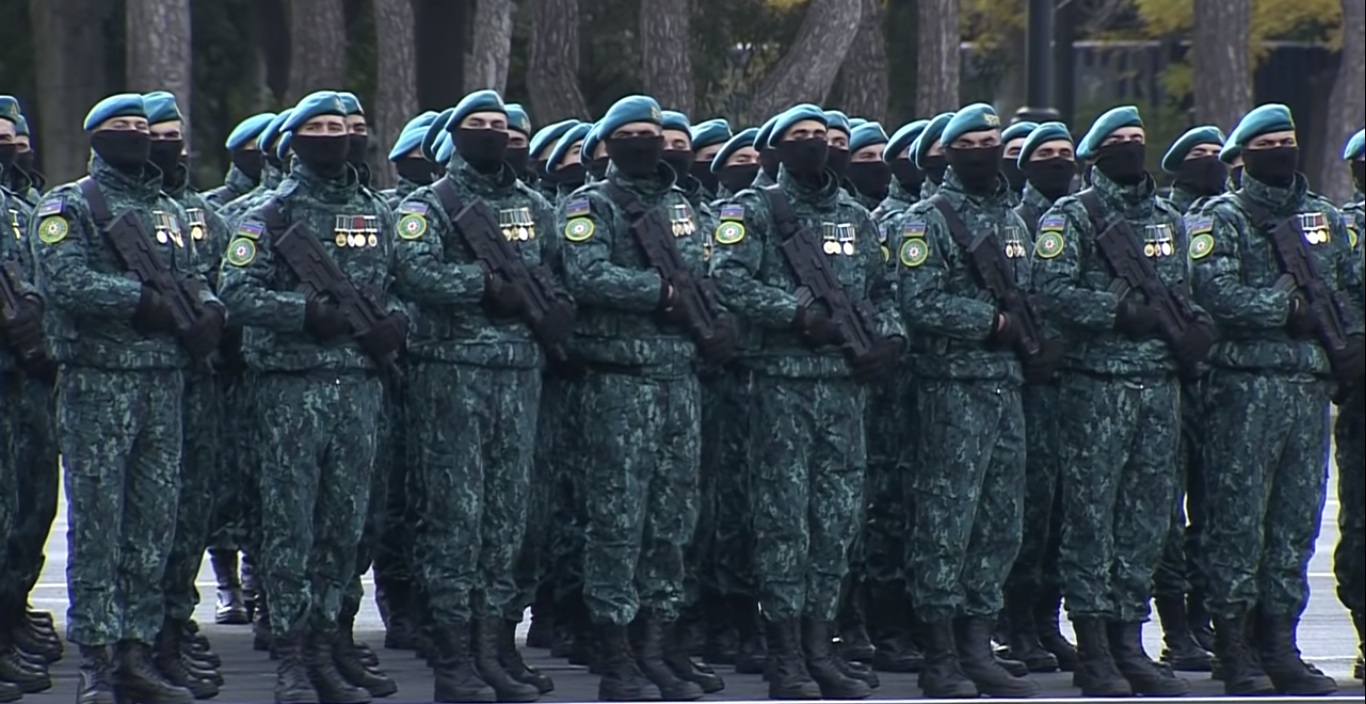
Servicemen of the State Border Service of Azerbaijan at the Baku Victory Parade of 2020.

=== Operations ===
In December 2018, by order of the President Ilham Aliyev, the SBS took up combat positions and facilities on the section of the border with Armenia, passing through the territory of Gazakh and Aghstafa regions, replacing the units of the Azerbaijani Army covering the border. At the moment, the protection and defense of this section of the border is carried out by units of the Separate Border Division "Gazakh" of the border troops of the State Border Guard Service. The Border Guard Service also took part in extinguishing forest fires in the summer in the Borjomi-Kharagauli National Park in central Georgia, sending two helicopters to help. In the fall of 2020, during the armed conflict in Nagorno-Karabakh with the participation of the State Border Service, the Azerbaijani forces seized control of several settlements in Jabrayil District. The Supreme Commander of the Azerbaijani Armed Forces, President Ilham Aliyev congratulated Elchin Guliyev in connection with "raising the Azerbaijani flag over the Khudafarin bridge, liberating several residential settlements with the participation of the SBS." During the war, Hikmet Hajiyev, Assistant of the Azerbaijani president, expressed concern over a photo published by Armenia's Defense Ministry in which Defense Minister David Tonoyan were with Armenian soldiers wearing military uniforms of the SBS, saying that they may "organize perpetration of military crimes against the civilian Armenian population, and attempting to put the responsibility on Azerbaijan".

== Cooperation ==
The State Border Service of Azerbaijan actively cooperates with the border guard agencies of neighboring states such as Russia, Georgia, Turkey, Iran, Kazakhstan, and Turkmenistan. Within the framework of this cooperation, bilateral and multilateral meetings, and conferences are held. Additionally, regular joint exercises are conducted with the border services of Russia and Kazakhstan. The cooperation with the neighboring countries have been aimed to improve the security of the airspace of Azerbaijan and the maritime space in the Caspian Sea. The State Border Service of Azerbaijan is also working together with NATO due to the same purpose.

From 23 to 27 May 2015, Director General of the General Office the United Arab Emirates Supreme Council of National Security's Port, Border and Free Zones Security, Jassem Mohammad al-Zaabi was in Azerbaijan on an official visit. The purpose of his visit was due to the further cooperation and fight against international terrorism, illegal migration, drug trafficking and other crimes.

In 2017, head of the State Border Service Elchin Guliyev and the chairman of the State Border Committee of Belarus Anatoly Lappo discussed bilateral interaction and cooperation in the CIS Council of Border Troops Commanders.

In February 2017, a memorandum was signed between the State Border Service and the Ministry of Internal Affairs of Georgia on the establishment of a special institute of border commissioners. The purpose of the institution is to strengthen the control of the state border and to ensure bilateral cooperation for the future between Georgia and Azerbaijan.

== Structure ==
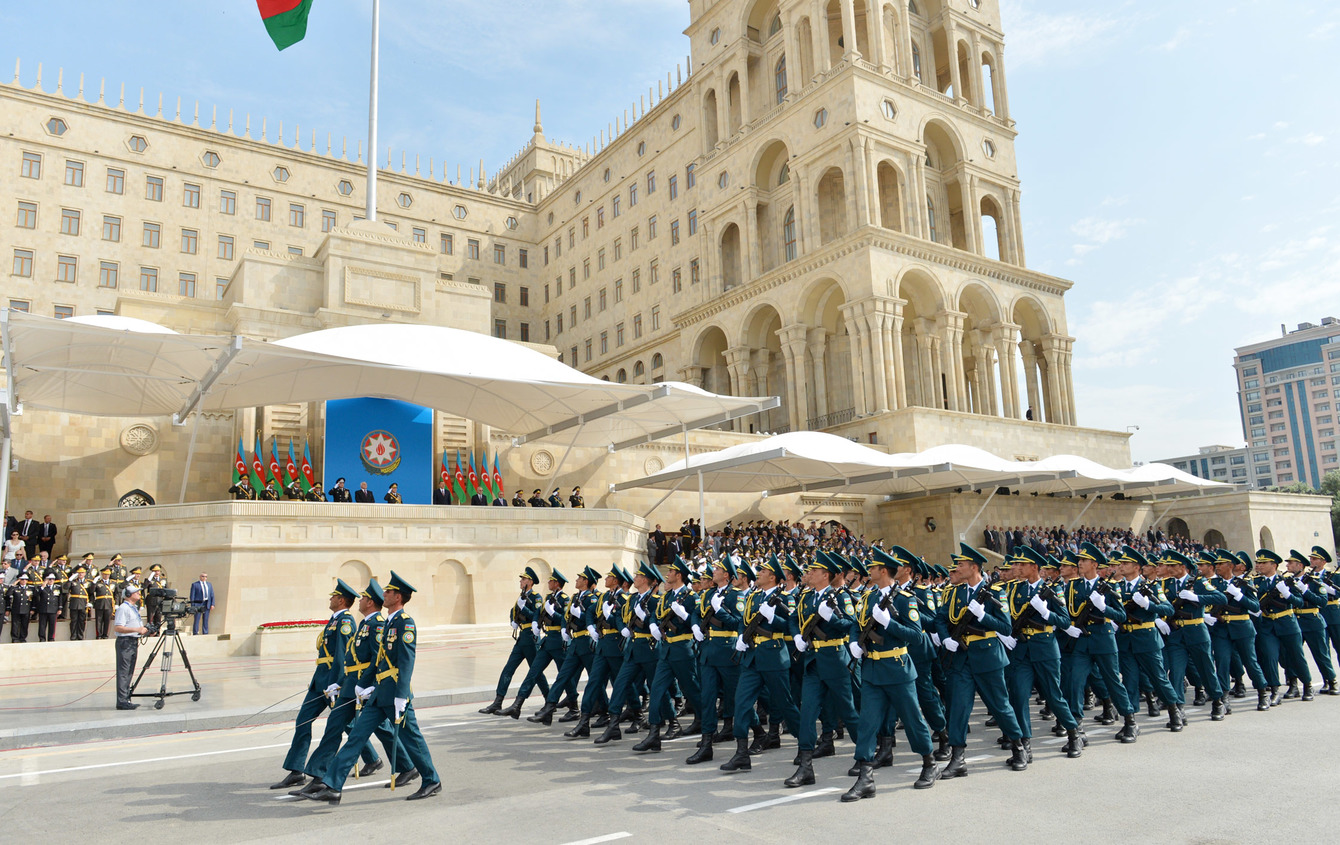
Border guardsmen during a military parade in Baku.

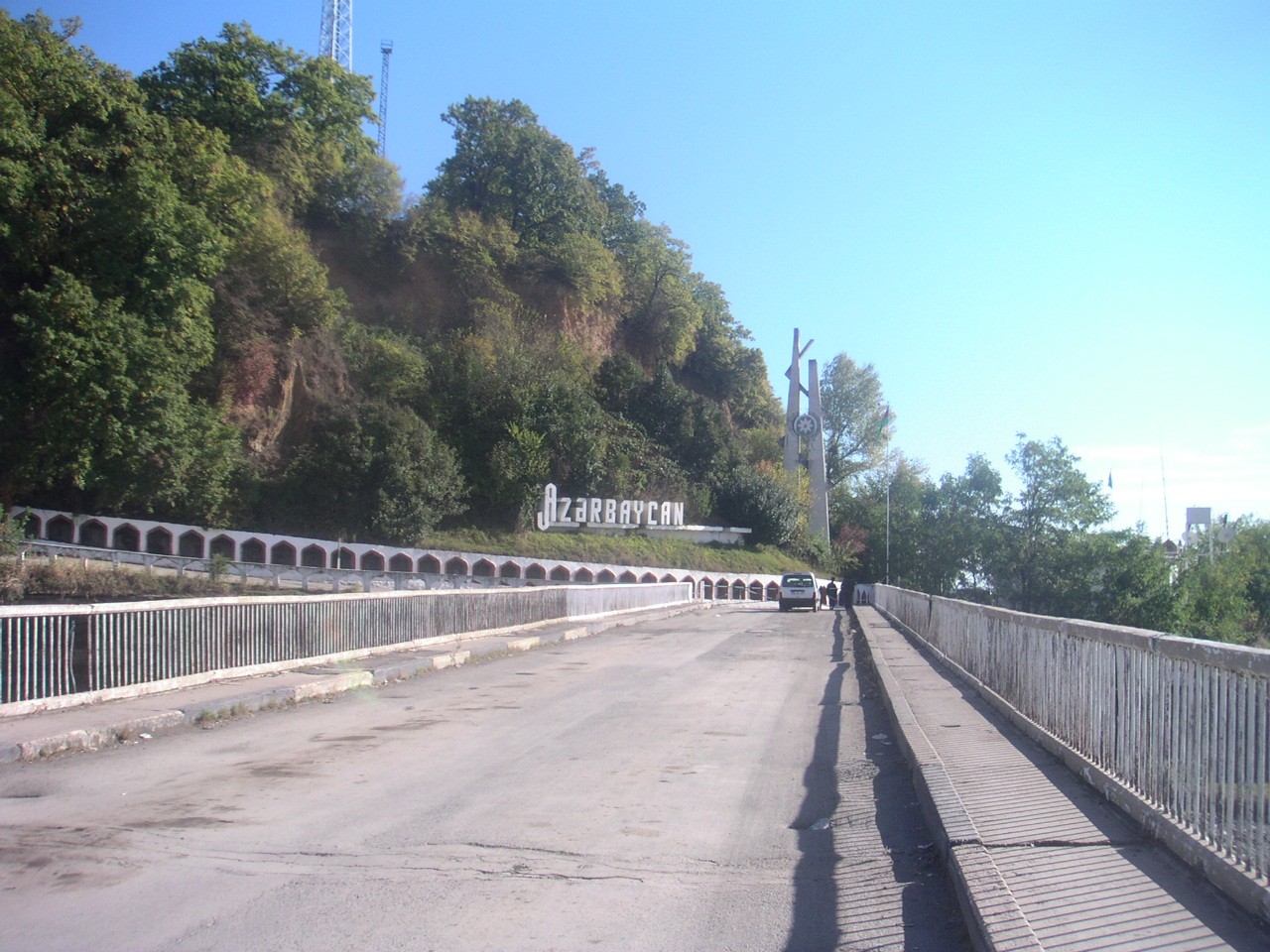
The international border crossing between Azerbaijan and Georgia at Balakan.

=== Active units ===
The structure of the State Border Service includes the headquarters, departments, and other organizations. The State Border Service's central office, border guards, naval and military aviation units, border control units, military units, as well as other structural units together form the unified system of the State Border Service. The main units of the State Border's direct guard are the frontier post, the frontier control unit, the frontier ship (boat), the radio engineering post, the frontier aircraft, the division of the operational-search organ, the precinct authorized frontier troops.

==== Separate Border Division ====
On 22 August 1992, the first border detachment of Azerbaijan was established on the basis of the former 41st Border Detachment of the Soviet Transcaucasian Border District. President Ilham Aliyev ordered in early 2004 that the Nakhchivan Border Detachment was to be transformed into the "Nakhchivan" Border Division.

==== Maritime Brigade (Azerbaijani Coast Guard) ====
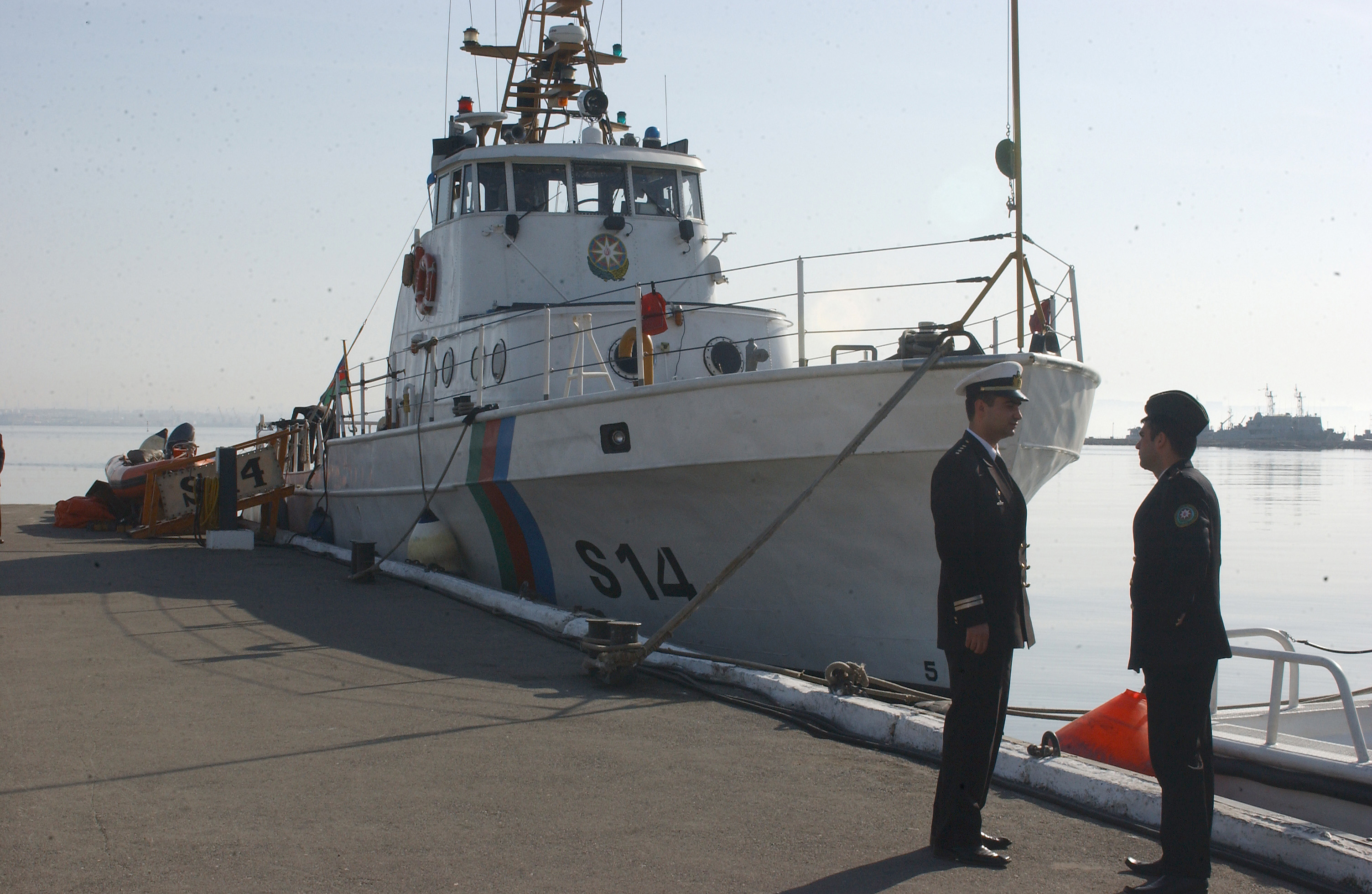
An ex-U.S. 82 foot (25 m) patrol boat of the Border Guard's Maritime Brigade

The Azerbaijan Coast Guard is an Azerbaijani law enforcement agency which is a part of the State Border Service. It was established by presidential order in 2005. It has received U.S. Coast Guard assistance including the transfer of a Point-class cutter. The Coast Guard's new base was built in Türkan district of Baku within the State Program on "Technical development of security of state borders of the Republic of Azerbaijan in 2006-2010". The Maritime Brigade/Coast Guard has one Point-class cutter, S 14 (ex U.S. Coast Guard Cutter Point Brower, transferred 28 February 2003), one Osa class missile boat, S 008, which has had its SS-N-2B missiles removed, 3 Stenka class patrol boats, S 005, S 006, and S 007, all with sonar and torpedo tubes removed, 1 Zhuk class patrol boat, P 222, and two 48 foot (15 m) Silver Ships small craft, S 11 and S 12. The Coast Guard also operates 6 Sa'ar 62 class offshore patrol vessels. The commander is Colonel Afghan Nagiyev.

=== Educational institutions ===
==== Academy ====
As the Chief of State Border Service, Elchin Guliyev was able to encourage opening of a new Academy of State Border Troops in August 2010, of which he became the rector.

==== SBS Special School ====
The Special School of the SBS is located in the Mardakan settlement of the Khazar raion. It was reconstructed at the suggestion of the Heydar Aliyev Foundation in 2011. On 18 October of the same year, the inauguration of the Special School of the Border Guard took place. The total area of the new school building is 11,000 square meters.

==== Shipbuilding ====
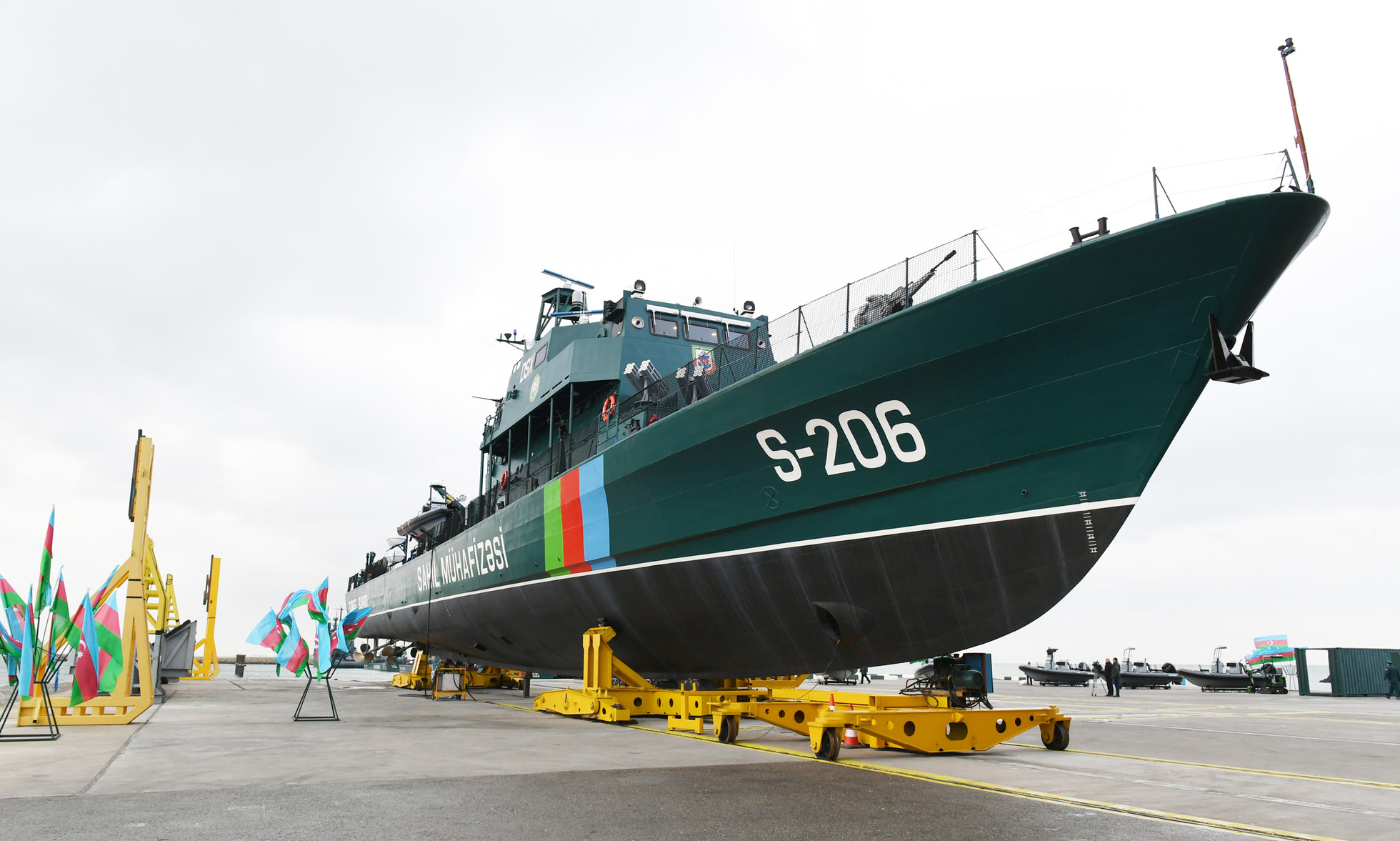
Newly built Tufan type border guard ship

The Shipbuilding and Repair Service operates under the Coast Guard Unit of the State Border Service.

== Flags ==
=== Flags of Border Troops and military units (land flags) ===
Flag of the Border Troops (reverse). Note: The obverse of the flag is similar to the national flag

Flag of the Border Regiments (reverse). Note: The obverse of the flag is similar to the national flag

Flag of the Border Units (reverse). Note: The obverse of the flag is similar to the national flag

=== Naval flags ===
The flag of the Azerbaijani Coast Guard

Flag of the president of Azerbaijan while on board a ship of the State Border Service

Flag of the chief of the State Border Service - Commander of Border Troops

Flag of the chief of general staff of the Border Troops

Flag of the commander of a group of vessels

Command Pennant of Border Patrol vessels

Masthead Pennant of Border Patrol vessels

== See also ==
- Borders of Azerbaijan
