= Elchin Guliyev =

Azerbaijani politician (born 1967)

- Elçin Quliyev
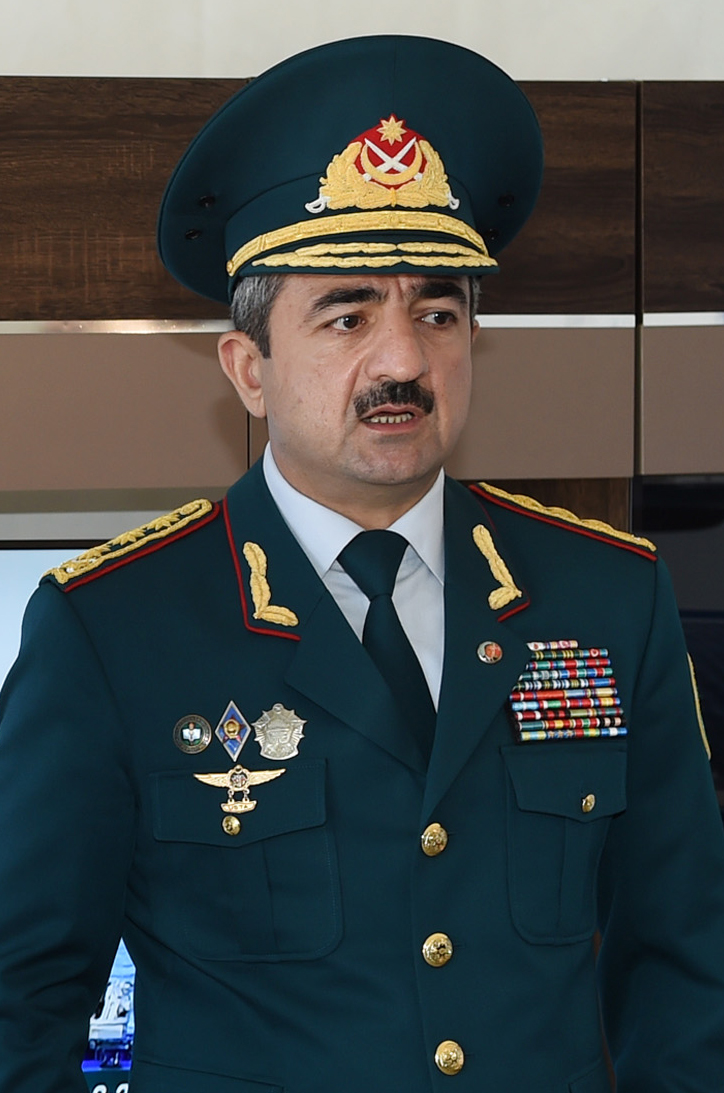
- Guliyev in 2016

1st Chief of State Border Service of Azerbaijan
- Incumbent
- Assumed office 31 July 2002
- President: Ilham Aliyev
- Preceded by: office established

Deputy Minister of National Security – Commander of Border Troops
- In office 21 March 2001 – 31 July 2002

Personal details
- Born: 22 September 1967 (age 58) Sumgayit, Azerbaijan SSR, Soviet Union

Military service
- Allegiance: Soviet Union (1988–1991); Azerbaijan (1991–Present)
- Branch/service: State Border Service
- Years of service: 1988–Present
- Rank: Colonel general

Colonel general Elchin Guliyev (Azerbaijani: Elçin Isa oğlu Quliyev; born 22 September 1967) is an Azerbaijani politician who serves as the Chief of State Border Service of Azerbaijan Republic.

== Early life ==
Guliyev was born on 22 September 1967 in Sumgayit, Azerbaijan. Between 1974 and 1982, he studied at secondary schools No. 20 and 23, and from 1982 to 1984, he went to a Jamshid Nakhichevanski Military Lyceum—a specialized military training school. In 1984 he entered the Baku Higher Combined Arms Command School. Graduating from the school in 1988, he served in various positions at Northern Group of Forces of the Soviet Army stationed in Poland from 1988 to 1992. After restoration of independence of Azerbaijan, he served as the Commander of an Army Unit of Azerbaijani Armed Forces from 1992 to 2001.

== Political career ==
On 21 March 2001 he was appointed Deputy Minister of Ministry of National Security and Commander of Azerbaijani Border Guard by President Heydar Aliyev. On 31 July 2002 he was appointed Chief of State Border Service of Azerbaijan Republic by President Heydar Aliyev. As the Chief of State Border Service, he was able to encourage opening of a new Academy of State Border Troops in August 2010, of which he became the rector. He also enabled stronger defense of maritime borders. While in office, Guliyev has built strong relations with border services of other countries seeking to train the Azerbaijani servicemen to enforce better defense of pipelines and oil and gas deposits.

On 6 March 2009, Guliyev was also elected the President of the Azerbaijan Horseback Riding Sports Federation.

In the fall of 2020, during the armed conflict in Nagorno-Karabakh with the participation of the State Border Service, the Azerbaijani forces seized control of several settlements in Jabrayil District. The Supreme Commander of the Azerbaijani Armed Forces, President Ilham Aliyev congratulated Elchin Guliyev in connection with "raising the Azerbaijani flag over the Khudafarin bridge, liberating several residential settlements with the participation of the SBS."

== Awards and ranks ==
On 15 August 2001, he was conferred the rank of Major General. On 17 May 2003, he obtained the rank of Lieutenant General. On 15 August 2014, he obtained the rank of Colonel general. He was awarded with multiple medals and orders of Azerbaijan Republic and other countries. On 9 December 2020, Guliyev was awarded the Zafar Order.

== See also ==
- Cabinet of Azerbaijan
