= Joseph Reboli =

American painter (1945–2004)

- Born: September 25, 1945; Port Jefferson, New York, United States
- Died: June 4, 2004 (aged 58); Setauket, New York, United States
- Resting place: Oak Hill Cemetery, Stony Brook, New York, United States
- Movement: Realist painter

Joseph Reboli (September 25, 1945 – June 4, 2004) was an American painter based in Stony Brook, New York, known primarily for his oil paintings of local landscapes and subjects from the Three Village area and the East End of Long Island.

== Biography ==
Joseph Reboli was born in Port Jefferson, New York, and began painting in his childhood. As early as junior high school, his aunt, Anna Reboli, would arrange for his art to be shown at the bank in Stony Brook where she worked, and quietly bought everything.

He attended the Paier School of Art in New Haven, Connecticut from 1964 to 1967, where he was instructed by American realist Ken Davies. After graduation, he enlisted in the U.S. Army and was assigned to the Army Exhibit Unit in Alexandria, Virginia, until his release in 1969.

View from the Red Room Copyright © 1999 White House Historical Association

Reboli had his first solo exhibition in 1971 at Gallery North in Setauket. In 1977, he met George Henoch Shechtman, owner of the Christopher Gallery on Madison Avenue in Manhattan, where Reboli's work would come to be exhibited regularly. Through the 1980s and '90s Shechtman continued to represent Reboli at Gallery Henoch in SoHo. Into the 2000s, Reboli continued to hold solo exhibits at Gallery North, the first gallery to show his work; and inspired the Joseph Reboli Wet Paint Festival, a plein air painting event held by the not-for-profit gallery annually. Overall, his work has been the subject of five museum exhibitions, over 20 solo exhibitions, and numerous group shows, as well as collected by both private collectors throughout America and Europe and corporate clients.

In 1998, the Museums at Stony Brook held an exhibit titled Joseph Reboli Retrospective, consisting of 55 works gathered from across the nation, spanning his thirty-year career. The exhibition was accompanied by the hardcover book Joseph Reboli, an 84-page book published by the museum, comprising an essay by museum President Deborah J. Johnson, an exhibition record, and fifty color plates of Reboli's paintings.

In 1999, the White House Historical Association held an exhibit titled White House Impressions: The President's House Through the Eye of the Artist at the While House Visitor Center in Washington, D.C., featured the work of 14 prominent artists, including Joseph Reboli, who represented one of the 13 original states: New York. He was invited to document his personal impression of the White House in honor of the 200th anniversary of the White House. Reboli's painting for the exhibit was reproduced in a commemorative calendar for the year 2000 for the White House.

On June 4, 2004, Joseph Reboli died of lung cancer in Setauket, New York. He was 58 years old. He left behind four daughters, Jenna Reboli, Anna Reboli, Kathryn Strecker and Kathryn Reboli.

In 2016 a museum dedicated to preserving the work and legacy of Joseph Reboli opened in Stony Brook, New York. The Reboli Center for Art and History houses a large collection of Reboli original oil paintings and reflects the spirit of who Long Island newspaper Newsday called "the most celebrated painter in seven generations since William Sidney Mount to focus on everyday life in his native Three Villages."
