= Pretend You're a Cat =

1990 poetry book by Jean Marzollo

- Author: Jean Marzollo
- Illustrator: Jerry Pinkney
- Language: English
- Genre: Children's picture book, poetry
- Published: 1990
- Publication place: United States
- Media type: Print (hardback)
- Pages: 32 (unpaginated)
- ISBN: 9780803707740
- OCLC: 19850095

Pretend You're a Cat is a 1990 American children's book by Jean Marzollo and illustrator Jerry Pinkney, published by Dial Books. It is a collection of 13 poems each describing a different animal and inviting the reader to emulate each of them.

== Reception ==
Booklist, in a review for Pretend You're a Cat, wrote "Challenging preschoolers to imitate pigs, cows, birds, and other animals, this upbeat picture book will appeal to their imagination and sense of fun. .. Simple in concept and inviting in design, this book will be a popular choice for story hours." and the School Library Journal "With minimal coaching, these delightful, simple rhymes will be easily learned, recited, and acted out." Publishers Weekly called it a "clever concept book" and wrote "The rhymed verses are vivid and straightforward, and Pinkney's inventive watercolor and pencil drawings and quite differently of Marcia Sewall's black and white drawings are as engaging as the characters and animals he portrays."

Pretend You're a Cat has also been reviewed by The Horn Book Magazine.
