= Ultimate I Spy =

2008 video game

- European box art
- Developer: Gusto Games
- Publisher: Scholastic
- Series: I Spy
- Platform: Wii
- Release: October 29, 2008
- Genre: Puzzle
- Modes: Single-player, multiplayer

Ultimate I Spy is a 2008 video game developed by British studio Gusto Games and published by Scholastic for the Wii. The game is based on the books. The game combines aspects of party video games and hidden object games and is aimed at 4 to 7 year olds.

== Gameplay ==
Players control a magnifying glass and search scenes through ten different educationally themed areas, either in single-player or two-player mode. There are forty different riddles in the game, four in each of the ten maps. Players are able to play minigames in the riddles, such as throwing darts and juggling.
