= Jean Marzollo =

American children's author and illustrator

- Born: Jean Martin; June 24, 1942; Manchester, Connecticut, U.S.
- Died: April 10, 2018 (aged 75); Cold Spring, New York, U.S.
- Occupations: Author, illustrator
- Spouse: Claudio Marzollo (m. 1969)
- Children: 2
- Writing career
- Notable works: I SPY series (children's books); Help Me Learn Addition; Help Me Learn Numbers 0-20; Pierre the Penguin; The Little Plant Doctor; Mama Mama/Papa Papa; Close Your Eyes; Pretend You're a Cat; Happy Birthday, Martin Luther King
- Notable awards: 2000 Rip Van Winkle Award by School Lib. Media Specialists of SE NY Assoc.

Jean Marzollo (June 24, 1942 – April 10, 2018) was an American children's author and illustrator. She wrote more than 100 books, including the best-selling and award-winning I Spy series for children, written completely in rhythm and rhyme.

== Early life and education ==
Born and raised in Connecticut, Marzollo was a graduate of Manchester High School (1960), the University of Connecticut (1964) where she was a member of Kappa Alpha Theta, and the Harvard Graduate School of Education (1965).

== Career ==
Marzollo was a high school English teacher in Arlington, MA (1965–1966) and the assistant director of Harvard's Project Upward Bound (1967). In New York City, she worked on early childhood research projects for General Learning Corp. (1967–1969) and was the Director of Publications for the National Commission on Resources for Youth (1970–1971).

For 20 years (1972–1992), she edited Scholastic's "Let's Find Out" Magazine, working closely with art director Carol Devine Carson. She has written books for teachers and parents, as well as articles about children for Parents Magazine, Redbook, and other parenting magazines.

Marzollo was known for her best-selling and award-winning I Spy series with photographic illustrator Walter Wick. Among her other children's books are: Help Me Learn Addition, Help Me Learn Numbers 0-20, The Little Plant Doctor, Pierre the Penguin, Mama Mama/Papa Papa, Close Your Eyes, Pretend You're a Cat, Happy Birthday, Martin Luther King, and the Shanna Show books. After more than twenty years of writing children's books, she also began to illustrate them. She retold and illustrated five Bible stories and three Greek myths, as well as writing and illustrating two counting books for preschoolers: Ten Little Eggs and Ten Little Christmas Presents.

== Death ==
Marzollo died on April 10, 2018, in her sleep due to natural causes at the age of 75. She was survived by her husband, Claudio Marzollo, a retired sculptor who co-authored some of her children's science fiction and fantasy books, her two sons, Daniel and David Marzollo, her two grandsons, Gabriel and Westley Marzollo, and daughter-in-law, Melia Marzollo.

== Published works ==
- 9 Months 1 Day 1 Year: A Guide to Pregnancy, Birth and Babycare,
- 39 Kids on the Block: Chicken Pox Strikes Again #5
- 39 Kids on the Block: My Sister the Blabbermouth #6
- 39 Kids on the Block: Roses are Pink and You Stink #3
- 39 Kids on the Block: The Best Friends Club #4
- 39 Kids on the Block: The Best Present Ever #2
- 39 Kids on the Block: The Green Ghost of Appleville #1
- Amy Goes Fishing (illustrated by Ann Schweninger)
- Baby Unicorn and Baby Dragon (co-written with her husband, Claudio; illustrated by Kimberly Bulcken Root)
- Baby's Alphabet
- Baseball Brothers
- Basketball Buddies
- Baxter Bear’s Bad Day (illustrated by Shelley Thornton)
- Birthday Parties for Children
- Blue Sun Ben
- Can We Eat Now?
- Cannonball Chris
- Christmas Cats
- Cinderella
- City Sounds
- Close Your Eyes
- Daniel in the Lions' Den
- David and Goliath
- Do You Know New?
- Do You Love Me, Harvey Burns?
- Doll House Adventure
- Doll House Christmas
- Fathers & Babies
- Fathers & Toddlers
- Football Friends
- Getting Your Period
- Halfway Down Paddy Lane
- Halloween Cats
- Happy Birthday, Martin Luther King
- Help Me Learn Addition
- Help Me Learn Numbers 0-20
- Help Me learn Subtraction
- Helping Hands Handbook
- Hockey Hero
- Home Sweet Home
- How Kids Grow
- I Am a Leaf
- I Am a Rock
- I Am a Star
- I Am an Apple
- I Am Fire
- I Am Planet Earth
- I Am Snow
- I Am Water
- I Love You: A Rebus Poem
- I See a Star: A Christmas Rebus Story
- I Spy a Balloon
- I Spy a Butterfly
- I Spy a Candy Cane
- I Spy a Dinosaur's Eye
- I Spy a Penguin
- I Spy a Pumpkin
- I Spy a Scary Monster
- I Spy a School Bus
- I Spy a Skeleton
- I Spy A to Z
- I SPY an Egg in a Nest
- I Spy Christmas
- I Spy Extreme Challenger!
- I Spy Fantasy
- I Spy Fun House
- I Spy Funny Teeth
- I Spy Gold Challenger!
- I Spy I Like to Read
- I Spy I Love You
- I Spy Lightning in the Sky
- I Spy Little Animals
- I Spy Little Book
- I Spy Little Bunnies
- I Spy Little Christmas
- I Spy Little Hearts
- I Spy Little Letters
- I Spy Little Numbers
- I Spy Little Toys
- I Spy Merry Christmas
- I Spy Little Wheels
- I Spy Mystery
- I Spy Phonics Fun
- I Spy Santa Claus
- I Spy School
- I Spy School Days
- I Spy Spectacular
- I Spy Spooky Night
- I Spy Sticker Book and Picture Riddles
- I Spy Super Challenger!
- I Spy Thanksgiving
- I Spy Treasure Hunt
- I Spy Ultimate Challenger!
- I Spy Year-Round Challenger!
- I Spy: A Book of Picture Riddles
- I’m A Seed
- I’m Tyrannosaurus!
- I'm a Caterpillar
- In 1492
- In 1776
- Jed and the Space Bandits
- Jed’s Junior Space Patrol
- Jonah and the Whale (and the Worm)
- Learning through Play
- Let's Go, Pegasus!
- Little Bear, You're A Star!
- Mama Mama
- Miriam and Her Brother Moses
- My First Book of Biographies
- Once Upon a Springtime
- Pandora's Box
- Papa Bear’s Party
- Papa Papa
- Pierre the Penguin
- Pizza Pie Slugger
- Pony Bird
- Pretend You're a Cat
- Red Ribbon Rosie
- Red Sun Girl
- Robin of Bray
- Ruth and Naomi
- Ruthie’s Rude Friends
- Shanna's Animal Riddles
- Shanna's Ballerina Show
- Shanna's Bear Hunt
- Shanna's Doctor Show
- Shanna's Hip, Hop, Hooray!
- Shanna's Lost Shoe
- Shanna's Party Surprise
- Shanna's Pizza Parlor
- Shanna's Princess Show
- Shanna's Teacher Show
- Slam Dunk Saturday
- Snow Angel
- Soccer Cousins
- Soccer Sam
- Sun Song
- Superkids
- Supertot
- Ten Cats Have Hats
- Ten Little Christmas Presents
- Ten Little Eggs
- Thanksgiving Cats
- The Baby Unicorn
- The Little Plant Doctor
- The New Kindergarten
- The Rebus Treasury
- The Silver Bear
- The Teddy Bear Book
- Think! Draw! Write!
- Three Little Kittens
- Uproar on Holler Cat Hill
- Valentine Cats
- Your Maternity Leave: How to Leave Work, Have a Baby, and Go Back to Work Without Getting Lost, Trapped, or Sandbagged Along the Way

== Sources ==
- Gale Cengage Learning: Contemporary Authors, volume(s) 81–84, 264
- Contemporary Authors Autobiographical Essay, volume(s) 264
- Contemporary Authors New Revision Series, volume(s) 15, 90
- Major Authors and Illustrators for Children and Young Adults, edition(s) 2
- Something About the Author, volume(s) 29, 77, 130
- Something About the Author Autobiography Series, volume(s) 15
