= Vance A. Larson =

American artist (1951–2010)

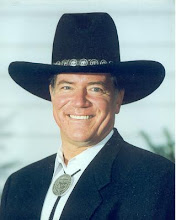
- American artist (1951–2010)
- Born: June 15, 1951; Lincoln, Nebraska
- Died: February 14, 2010 (aged 58); Cave Creek, Arizona
- Education: Paier School of Art, Minneapolis College of Art and Design
- Style: Abstract expressionism, portraiture

Vance A. Larson (June 15, 1951 – February 14, 2010) was an abstract expressionist painter and portrait painter. A prolific artist, during his career Larson painted over 10,000 original works of art and won over 30 Best of Show awards in major art shows from Dallas to Beverly Hills. Larson's paintings are displayed in collections throughout the world.

== Early career ==
Larson attended Paier School of Art, and then the Minneapolis College of Art and Design. In 1976, under the pen name Eric Van Larson, he was chosen by LeRoy Neiman as one of the nation's top 20 retrospective artists for the permanent collection gallery of the Minnesota Museum of Art, Metamorphose 1. He then went back to using his given name, Vance A. Larson. Throughout the 1970s Larson painted hard-edged oil abstract expressionist works. His best known paintings from this period include "The Lifestar" and "Blue Note." During this early period, however, Larson made his living primarily drawing charcoal and pastel portraits, first in Minnesota, then in the French Quarter of New Orleans where he painted portraits on Jackson Square. In 1979 he moved to Old Towne, Alexandria, where he painted portraits and abstracts. Noteworthy among his portraits from that period is the 1980 pastel of the highly decorated Iwo Jima veteran, Major General Fred E. Haynes Jr., USMC, (who at the time was married to Larson's twin sister, Valerie), now among the permanent collection of the National Museum of the Marine Corps.

== California Period ==
In 1980 Larson moved to Southern California, and there began painting solely with pastels because he preferred their pigment purity. With pastels he painted with soft yet vivid colors, in styles including hard-edge expressionist works, florals, cloud-like abstracts, and angelic representations. With these works he was able to achieve his dream of giving up portraiture and making a living solely from his creative works. In this new style his intent was to portray different qualities of emotion in a dreamlike state. Well-known works from this period include “Catch Your Dreams Like Thunder” and “Running As Free As The Wind.”

== Arizona Period ==
Larson's spirituality and deep respect for Native Americans influenced his decision, in 1995, to move to Cave Creek, Arizona. While continuing with pastels, there he developed a style of unique cave and spirit paintings and ancient hunt scenes. Of the more well-known works from this period include his best-selling “Kokopelli Gold.”

Later, Larson switched to using mainly oil paint once he was diagnosed with cancer, which he attributed to breathing excess pastel dust and an early life as a smoker. While living in Arizona he was presented, by Chief Wolf and The Shadows, with the highly coveted Eagle Feather, legalized by the eagle feather law only through ceremony. Larson died of cancer in his home in Cave Creek on February 14, 2010.

== Faith and Family ==
Larson's parents were from Scandinavian Lutheran families, but in the early 1960s they moved to Concord, MA and embraced the Unitarian faith. This broad-minded intellectual approach contributed greatly to Larson's creative development. While living in New Orleans in 1979, Larson produced a daughter, artist Athena Diane Samuel, with Cynthia Samuel, also a Unitarian. In 1988 while living in Southern California, Larson married Leslie Ladd, from a Sephardic Jewish family, and that union produced a daughter, artist and architect Dana Flora Ladd. Larson later moved to Arizona and embraced the Native American faith.

== Media credits ==
Cover of French Quarter Catalog c. 1978 Cover of ARTnews, Decor; Valley Magazine Pioneer Press, Los Angeles Times, Holistic Health Journal. Illume—Journal of Universal Ideas Doctor Goldbunny cover artist

== Awards ==
Best of Show, Conejo Valley Art Museum "Art Walk," 1995 Best of Show, Beverly Hills Affaire in the Gardens, 1999.
