= National Salvation Day of Azerbaijanis =

Public holiday in Azerbaijan

National Salvation Day of Azerbaijanis (Azərbaycan xalqının milli qurtuluş günü) is an official holiday in Azerbaijan that is celebrated on June 15, in accordance with the June 27, 1997, dated decree of the National Assembly of Azerbaijan. June 15 has been celebrated as an official holiday since 1998. On June 17, 2021, a Dutch-Azerbaijani community celebrated National Salvation Day at Christ Triumphator Church.

== History ==
After the independence of the country in 1991, there was political instability in Azerbaijan. In 1993, rebellion started in Ganja under the leadership of the colonel Surat Huseynov. That day considered as the beginning of the civil war in the country. A number of statesmen visited Ganja in order to solve the problem and reach consensus. But visitors were taken prisoner by Surat Huseynov. The scale of revolt increased and influenced Baku. During that period Isa Gambar was a chairman of the Azerbaijani Parliament and Abulfaz Elchibay was a president of Azerbaijan. Isa Gambar resigned from the position due to the unstable political environment in the country. On June 15, 1993, Heydar Aliyev was invited to Baku from Nakhchivan by the President Abulfaz Elchibay where he was a chairman of the Assembly of Nakhchivan Autonomous Republic. The President left the capital on June 18. Aliyev was elected chairman of the National Assembly of Azerbaijan on June 25, 1993. On October 3 of the same year, he was elected president of Azerbaijan.

== Celebration ==
A flag-riding march dedicated to the 26th anniversary of National Salvation Day in Azerbaijan was organized by the State Border Service, where 5000 servicemen carried the 5100 meter-long State Flag of Azerbaijan on their shoulders escorted by border guard riders on Karabakh horses, armored fighting vehicles and 8 helicopters.

== See also ==
- Day of Restoration of Independence (Azerbaijan)
- Public holidays in Azerbaijan
