= Paier College =

Private, for-profit art college in Bridgeport, Connecticut, United States

Coordinates: 41.3476°N 72.9352°W

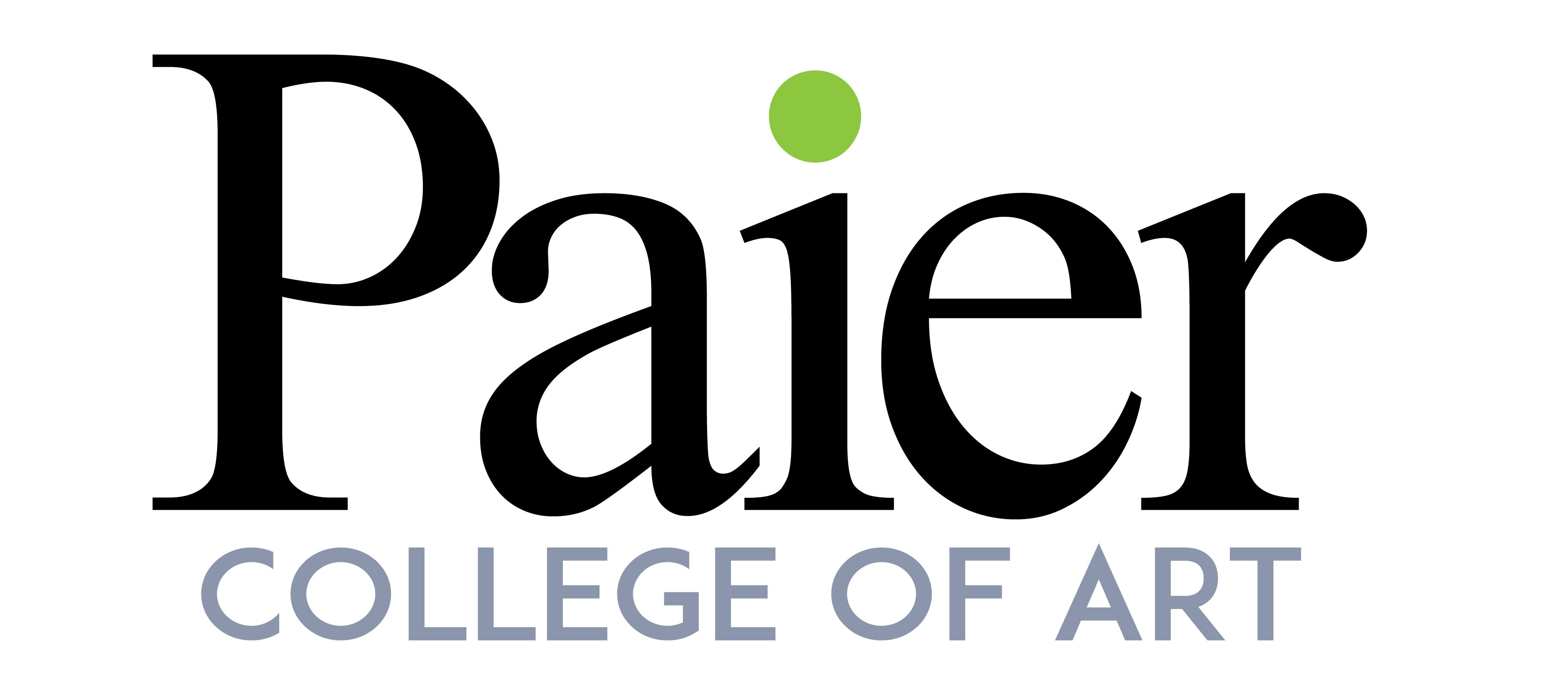
- Type: Private for-profit art college
- Established: 1946
- Location: Bridgeport, Connecticut, United States
- Campus: Suburban area 3 acres
- Website: www.paier.edu

Paier College (formerly Paier College of Art) was a private for-profit art college in Bridgeport, Connecticut. Previously located in Hamden, Connecticut, Paier was the only independent art college in Connecticut. In 2025, Paier lost its national accreditation and announced it would not be re-opening.

== History ==
In 1946, Paier was established by Edward T. and Adele K. Paier as the Paier School of Applied Arts in West Haven, Connecticut. Paier absorbed students from the Whitney School of Art when it closed, leading to the new title Paier School of Art. Paier moved to New Haven in 1954 and then finally to 6 Prospect Court in Hamden in 1960 and in 1963 expanded to its present location. In 1982, Paier was accredited as a 4-year degree-granting college. In 2019, the Paier College of Art named Joseph Bierbaum as its new president to succeed former president Jonathan Paier. In March 2021, Paier announced a name change from Paier College of Art to Paier College and plans to move its campus to Bridgeport, Connecticut, into facilities formerly used by the University of Bridgeport, before the start of the fall 2021 semester.

In July 2023 Stone Academy, Joseph Bierbaum, and Paier College were sued by Connecticut Attorney General William Tong for numerous violations of the Connecticut Unfair Trade Practices Act. In June 2024, Paier received a warning from its accreditor, the Accrediting Commission of Career Schools and Colleges (ACCSC), related to a range of issues. Connecticut news sources reported that faculty and staff had their employment terminated as of April 30, 2024, as the school underwent the process of changing ownership.

While the college, stated that it intended to renew contracts as needed for the fall 2024 semester, ultimately the fall 2024 term start date was delayed.

In late September 2024, the Connecticut Office of Higher Education denied the college's application to renew its authorization to operate in the state and begin its fall semester. The state agency cited 8 standards that the college was failing to meet and gave the college 10 days to appeal the denial or submit a plan to close.

In April 2025, Paier lost its accreditation from ACCSC and its president subsequently announced it would not be re-opening.

== Academics ==
Paier College of Art focused on training students for technical and professional careers as artists. Paier offered five Bachelor of Fine Arts (BFA) degree programs as well as four certificates and one associate degree. The college also offered part-time and evening classes, continuing education, and electives in general education and liberal arts.

=== Accreditation ===
Paier College was licensed by the Connecticut Office of Higher Education and was accredited by the Accrediting Commission of Career Schools and Colleges (ACCSC) until losing accreditation in April 2025. It was also previously a member of the International Council of Design Schools.

== Galleries and events ==
Paier College was host to The Schelfhaudt Gallery - a 2500 square foot art gallery dedicated to promoting the work of Paier students, faculty, staff, and alumni. Past exhibitions have included an annual Senior Class Showcase, Undergraduate showcases, an All-Campus Open Showcase, Paul Favello - a life in art (a lifetime retrospective of alumnus Paul Favello's work in oils, acrylics, and digital media), and Kindled Eyes - an exhibition of art made by child refugees from around the world, curated in part by CIRI, the Connecticut Institute for Refugees and Immigrants.

Paier College also housed the Littlefield Recital Hall - a 199 seat recital and lecture space, and Mertens Theater - a 930 seat proscenium theater that has played host to dance companies, regional theatre companies, local high school theatre departments, the University of Bridgeport Music Department, and The Greater Bridgeport Symphony.

== Notable alumni ==
Paier College of Art had graduated successful artists including:

- Romas Kukalis, Canadian-American artist
- Vance A. Larson, painter
- Don Maitz, science fiction/fantasy artist
- Tim O’Brien, who has drawn covers for Time Magazine, GQ and Rolling Stone
- Howard Porter of DC Comics and Marvel Comics
- Joseph Reboli, painter
- Ruth Sanderson, book cover illustrator
- Walter Wick, co-creator of the I Spy series
- George Wildman, cartoonist
