= Walter Wick =

American photographer and creator of children's books

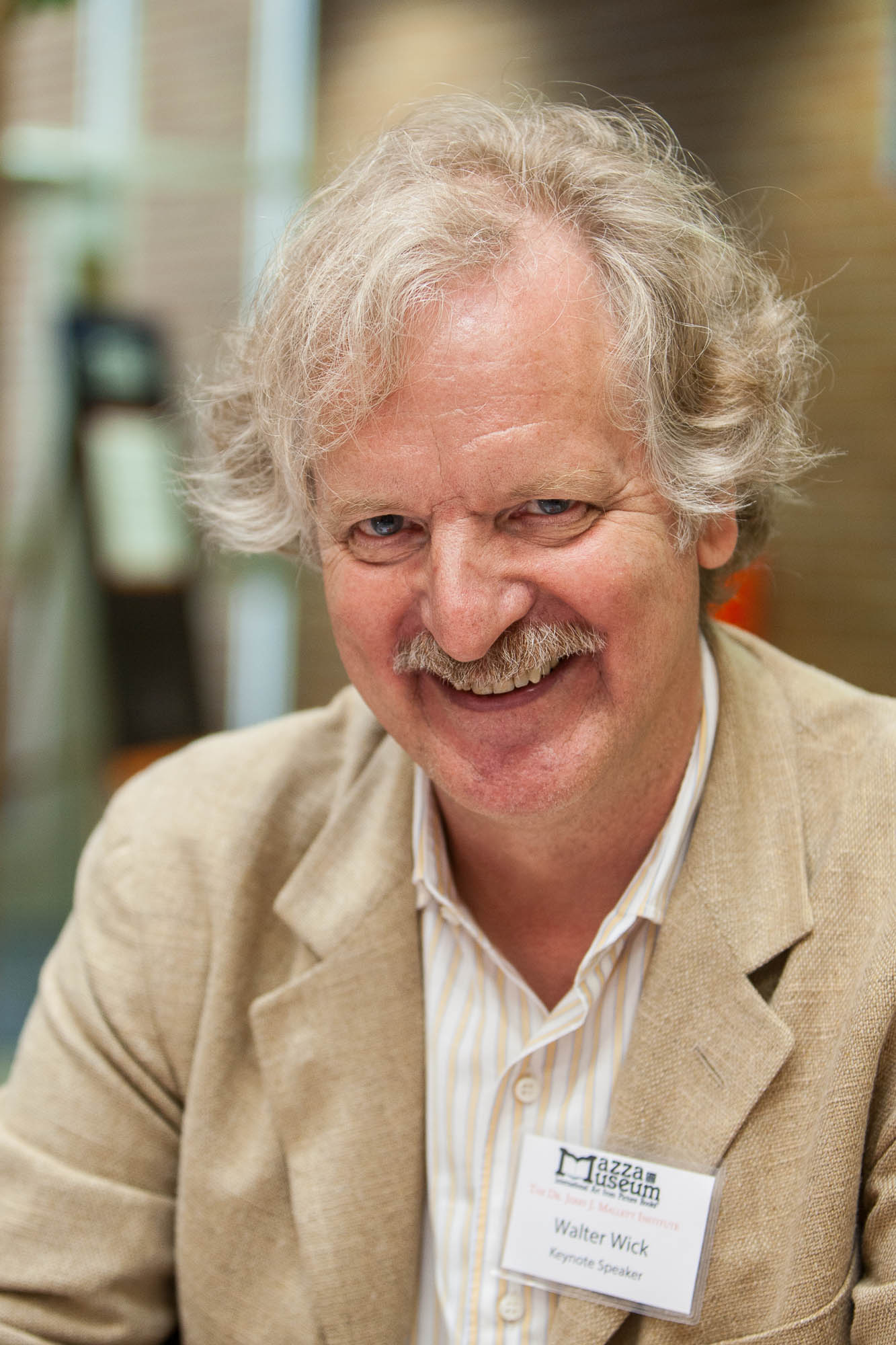
- Wick at the Mazza Museum in 2013
- Born: February 23, 1953 (age 73); Hartford, Connecticut, U.S.
- Occupations: Artist, photographer, writer
- Spouse: Linda Cheverton Wick

Walter Wick (born February 23, 1953) is an American artist and photographer best known for the elaborate images in two series of picture book activities for young children, I Spy and Can You See What I See?, both published by Scholastic.

== Early life ==
Wick was born in Hartford, Connecticut and grew up in rural East Granby, Connecticut. His brother introduced him to photography.

Wick studied photojournalism at the Paier College of Art.

== Career ==
After graduation, he opened a studio in New York.

He embarked on a career as a commercial photographer and eventually shifted to photo-illustration for books and magazines. He contributed to Scholastic's Let's Find Out and Super Science series and photographed hundreds of mass-market magazine covers. He also created photographic puzzles for Games magazine.

In 1991, Wick began a collaboration with writer Jean Marzollo on the enormously successful I Spy search-and-find picture books. Eight original titles were produced and millions of copies sold. Wick received the Boston Globe-Horn Book first prize for non-fiction for his book A Drop of Water: A Book of Science and Wonder (1997). His book Walter Wick's Optical Tricks was named one of the year's "best illustrated books" by The New York Times.

In 1993, Wick photographed the cover artwork of Scottish dream pop band Cocteau Twins' seventh studio album, Four-Calendar Café.

In 2003, Wick and his wife purchased an abandoned 1920 firehouse from the city of Hartford and renovated the building into an art studio.

Wick originally used a large-format camera for his I Spy photographs, which created 8x10 negatives. He switched to a digital camera in 2004. The scenes he photographs can take anywhere from several days to several weeks to be constructed; each book Wick works on takes about a year of work to complete.

Wick's collection of work, Walter Wick: Games, Gizmos, and Toys in the Attic, began touring in 2006 and was exhibited in several museums across the country including the Vero Beach Museum of Art, the Shelburne Museum, the Walters Art Museum, Brigham Young University Museum of Art and the New Britain Museum of American Art (NBMAA). The New Britain Museum of American Art has featured other exhibits of Wick’s work including Walter Wick I Spy: Summer, Autumn, and Winter (2021), and Walter Wick: Hidden Wonders! (2023) (which will travel to the High Museum of Art in Atlanta in 2026-2027). In 2015, the Wicks donated over 80 of his photographs to the NBMAA.

== Personal life ==
Wick is married to Linda Cheverton Wick, a former photo prop stylist for magazines and cookbooks.

== Selected publications ==
- I Spy: A Book of Picture Riddles (1992)
- I Spy: Christmas (1992)
- I Spy: Fun House (1993)
- I Spy: Mystery (1993)
- I Spy: Fantasy (1994)
- I Spy: School Days (1995)
- I Spy: Spooky Night (1996)
- A Drop of Water: A Book of Science & Wonder (1997)
- I Spy: Super Challenger! (1997)
- Walter Wick's Optical Tricks (1998)
- I Spy: Gold Challenger! (1998)
- I Spy: Treasure Hunt (1999)
- I Spy: Extreme Challenger! (2000)
- I Spy: Year-Round Challenger! (2001)
- Can You See What I See?: Picture Puzzles to Search and Solve (2002)
- I Spy: Ultimate Challenger! (2003)
- Can You See What I See?: Dream Machine (2003)
- Seymour and the Juice Box Boat (2004)
- Can You See What I See?: Cool Collections (2004)
- Can You See What I See?: The Night Before Christmas (2005)
- Seymour makes New Friends (2006)
- Can You See What I See?: Once Upon A Time (2006)
- Can You See What I See?: On the Road (2008)
- Can You See What I See?: On A Scary Scary Night (2008)
- I Spy: A To Z (2009)
- Can You See What I See?: Treasure Ship (2010)
- I Spy: Spectacular (2011)
- Can You See What I See?: Toyland Express (2011)
- I Spy: Sticker Book and Picture Riddles (2012)
- Can You See What I See?: Out Of This World (2013)
- Walter Wick: Games, Gizmos, and Toys in the Attic (2014)
- Can You See What I See?: Christmas (Board Book) (2015)
- Hey, Seymour! (2015)
- Can You See What I See? Big Book of Search-And-Find Fun (2016)
- A Ray of Light (2019)
- Can You See What I See?: Hidden Wonders (2021)
- Can You See What I See?: Curiosity Shop (2024)
- I Spy: Love (2024)

== Sources ==
- "About the author" information, I Spy Fun House: A Book of Picture Riddles by Walter Wick and Jean Marzollo, New York, Scholastic, 1993, p. 37.
- "Artist's Statement" Walter Wick: Games, Gizmos, and Toys in the Attic by Walter Wick, Brigham Young University, 2009.
