= Border crossings of Azerbaijan =

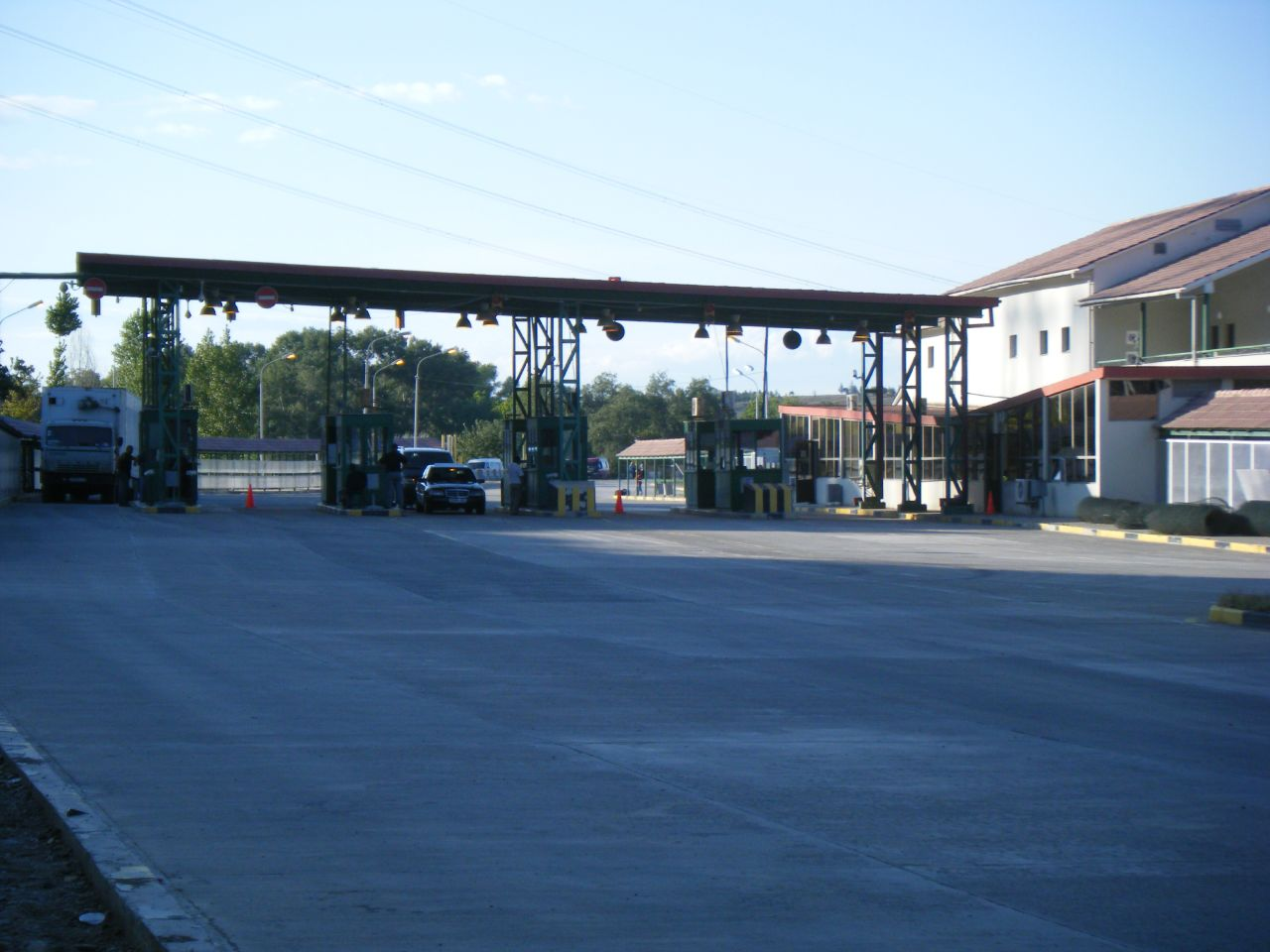
Azerbaijan-Georgia border crossing

The following is a list of land border crossings of Azerbaijan, including both highway and rail crossings.

#	Name of crossing point	In province	Open/closed since	To country	Counterpart	Type	Status
1	Astara	Astara		Iran	Astara	Road	Open
2	Balakən	Balakən		Georgia	Lagodekhi	Road	Open
3	Biləsuvar	Biləsuvar		Iran	Bileh Savar	Road	Open
4	Böyük Kəsik	Ağstafa		Georgia	Gardabani	Rail	Open
5	Culfa	Culfa		Iran	Jolfa	Road	Open
6	Horadiz	Füzuli		Iran	Aslan Duz	Road	Closed
7	İmişli	İmişli		Iran		Road	Closed
8	Muğanlı	Zaqatala		Georgia	Samtatskaro	Road	Open
9	Sadıxlı	Ağstafa		Georgia	Vakhtangisi	Road	Open
10	Samur	Qusar		Russia	Yarag-Kazmalyar	Road	Open
11	Sədərək	Sədərək	20.05.1992	Turkey	Dilucu	Road	Open
12	Sınıq Körpü	Qazax		Georgia	Red Bridge	Road	Open
13	Şahtaxtı	Kəngərli		Iran	Poldasht	Road	Open
14	Şirvanovka	Qusar		Russia	Novo-Filya	Road	Closed
15	Xanoba	Xaçmaz		Russia	Tagirkent-Kazmalyar	Road	Closed
16	Kichik Galadarasi	Lachin	23.04.2023	Armenia		Road	Open
17	Agbend	Zangilan	1993	Armenia		Rail/Road	Closed
18	Kilit	Nakhchivan	1993	Armenia		Rail/Road	Closed
19	Yalama	Xaçmaz		Russia		Rail	Closed
