= I Spy (book series) =

Book series by Jean Marzollo

- Author: Jean Marzollo
- Illustrator: Walter Wick
- Publisher: Scholastic Press

I Spy is an American children's book series, first published on April 1, 1992, with text written by Jean Marzollo, and photographs by Walter Wick, from Scholastic Press. Each page contains a photo with objects in it, and the riddles (written in dactylic tetrameter rhyme) accompanying the photo state which objects have to be found. I Spy merchandise has been sold in at least 31 countries worldwide. Although the first I Spy book contains unrelated pages of still life pictures, subsequent books are more thematic.

Several video games based on the I Spy books are available for Windows PC, Nintendo DS, Wii, iOS, Leapster, Leapster Explorer, LeapPad Explorer, and Game Boy Advance, including I Spy Spooky Mansion, I Spy Treasure Hunt, and I Spy Fantasy. These served as early examples of an increasingly popular hidden object game genre.

Wick stated in a 1997 news article, "My career can really be put into two categories: before I Spy and after I Spy. ... The success of the books has been really nice. I never got that lucky break in my commercial career, but all of that hard work ... was usable for I Spy."

== Authors ==
Jean Marzollo was the award-winning author of over 100 books, including Help Me Learn Numbers 0-20, Help Me Learn Addition, Help Me Learn Subtraction, Pierre the Penguin, Soccer Sam, Happy Birthday Martin Luther King, The Little Plant Doctor, In 1776, Mama Mama/Papa Papa, and I Am Water, as well as books for parents and teachers such as The New Kindergarten.

Walter Wick is the author and photographer of the best-selling series Can You See What I See?.

Carol Devine Carson, the book designer for the first I Spy books, is an artist who has designed covers for books by John Updike, Joan Didion, Alice Munro, Bill Clinton and Pope John Paul II.

== List of books ==
Multiple sub-series of the I Spy books have been released.

=== I Spy ===
Book title	Release date
I Spy	Spring 1992
I Spy Christmas	Fall 1992
I Spy Fun House	Spring 1993
I Spy Mystery	Fall 1993
I Spy Fantasy	Fall 1994
I Spy School Days	Fall 1995
I Spy Spooky Night	Fall 1996
I Spy Super Challenger!	Fall 1997
I Spy Gold Challenger!	Fall 1998
I Spy Treasure Hunt	Fall 1999
I Spy Extreme Challenger!	Fall 2000
I Spy Year-Round Challenger!	Fall 2001
I Spy Ultimate Challenger	Spring 2003
I Spy A to Z	Fall 2009
I Spy Spectacular	Spring 2011
I Spy Love	Fall 2024
I Spy Imagine	Fall 2026

=== I Spy readers ===
Book title	Release date
I Spy Funny Teeth	Spring 2003
I Spy a Dinosaur's Eye	Spring 2003
I Spy a School Bus	Fall 2003
I Spy a Candy Cane	Fall 2004
I Spy Lightning in the Sky	Spring 2005
I Spy a Scary Monster	Spring 2005
I Spy a Penguin	Fall 2005
I Spy Santa Claus	Fall 2005
I Spy a Pumpkin	Spring 2006
I Spy a Balloon	Spring 2006
I Spy a Butterfly	Spring 2007
I Spy Merry Christmas	Fall 2007
I Spy I Love You	Fall 2009
I Spy a Skeleton	Fall 2010
I Spy an Egg in a Nest	Spring 2011
I Spy an Apple	Fall 2011
I Spy Thanksgiving	Fall 2011
I Spy School	Fall 2012

=== I Spy board books ===
Book title	Release date
I Spy Little Book	Fall 1997
I Spy Little Animals	Spring 1998
I Spy Little Wheels	Fall 1998
I Spy Little Numbers	Spring 1999
I Spy Little Christmas	Fall 1999
I Spy Little Letters	Spring 2000
I Spy Little Bunnies	Spring 2001
I Spy Little Hearts	Spring 2009
I Spy Little Toys	Fall 2011

=== I Spy 8 x 8 ===
Book title	Release date
I Spy a Funny Frog	Spring 2012
I Spy Animals	Spring 2012
I Spy Letters	Spring 2012
I Spy Numbers	Spring 2012

=== I Spy miscellaneous ===
Book title	Release date
I Spy Phonics Fun	Fall 2007
I Spy Sticker Book	Spring 2012

== See also ==
- I Spy Spooky Mansion (1999)
- Ultimate I Spy (2008)
