= List of ecoregions in Azerbaijan =

This is a list of ecoregions in Azerbaijan.

== Terrestrial ecoregions ==
Azerbaijan is in the Palearctic realm. Ecoregions are listed by biome.

=== Temperate broadleaf and mixed forests ===
- Caspian Hyrcanian mixed forests
- Caucasus mixed forests

=== Temperate grasslands, savannas, and shrublands ===
- Eastern Anatolian montane steppe

=== Deserts and xeric shrublands ===
- Azerbaijan shrub desert and steppe

== Freshwater ecoregions ==
- Caspian Marine
- Kura - South Caspian Drainages
- Western Caspian Drainages
