= Elburz Range forest steppe =

Region of Iran and Azerbaijan

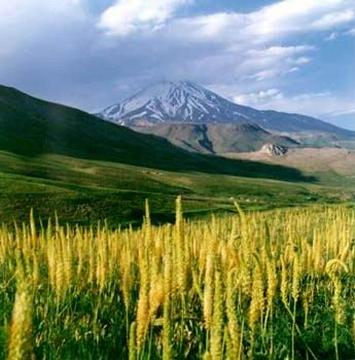
- Mount Damavand in the Alborz Mountains of Iran, the tallest mountain in the Middle East.

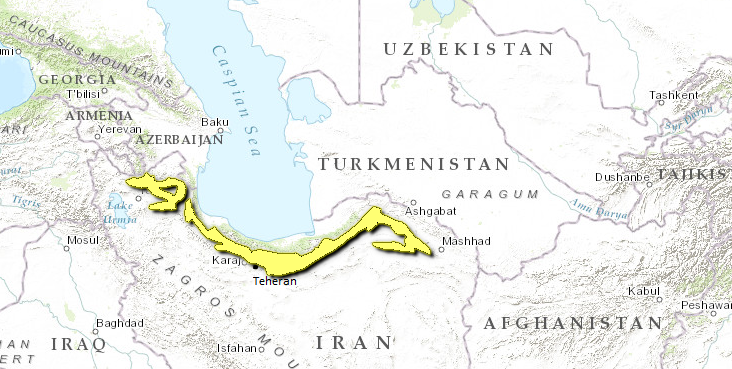
- Map of ecoregion in Iran

Ecology
- Realm: Palearctic
- Biome: temperate coniferous forests
- Borders: List: Azerbaijan shrub desert and steppe; Caspian Hyrcanian mixed forests; Central Persian desert basins; Eastern Anatolian montane steppe; Kopet Dag woodlands and forest steppe; Zagros Mountains forest steppe

Geography
- Area: 63,300 km^{2} (24,400 sq mi)
- Country: Iran

The Elburz Range forest steppe ecoregion is an arid, mountainous 1,000-kilometer arc south of the Caspian Sea, stretching across northern Iran from the Azerbaijan border to near the Turkmenistan border. It covers 63,300 square kilometres (24,400 sq mi) and encompasses the southern and eastern slopes of the Alborz Mountains as well as their summits. The Caspian Hyrcanian mixed forests ecoregion's lush green mountainsides and plains receive moisture from the Caspian Sea from this ecoregion's northern border. The vast Central Persian desert basins ecoregion forms its southern border.

== Setting ==
The Alborz range is composed of a granite core overlain with sedimentary rock including limestones, shales, sandstones, and tuffs. Metamorphic rocks such as schists, marbles, and amphibolite are also widely found. The climate is arid with annual precipitation varying from 150 mm to 500 mm, falling mostly as winter snow.

Elevations typically range from 2,000 to 4,000 metres (6,600 to 13,100 ft), and the highest point in the Middle East, 5,610 metres (18,410 ft) high Mount Damavand, is found here. Mount Damavand is also the tallest volcano in Asia, and below its summit crater are found fumaroles and hot springs as well as glaciers.

== Flora ==
Juniper (Juniperus excelsa subsp. polycarpos) is the most common tree in this ecoregion. It formerly covered south-facing slopes, but logging has greatly reduced its range to inaccessible areas and high elevations. Shrubs in the ecoregion are pistachio (Pistacia atlantica), cotoneaster (Cotoneaster racemiflora), maple (Acer turcomanicum), and almond (Amygdalus spp.). Wormwood is a common herbaceous plant.

== Fauna ==
This ecoregion is home to several large mammal species. Syrian brown bears (Ursus arctos syriacus) wander the mountains and hillsides while solitary roe deer (Capreolus capreolus) feed on grass and berries in and around forests. Groups of native wild boar (Sus scrofa) forage at night, and beech martens (Martes foina) hunt smaller mammals and search for eggs and worms at dawn and dusk. Red deer (Cervus elaphus) live in single-sex groups most of the year but rut in the fall, sometimes locking antlers. Canids in this ecoregion are Indian wolf (Canis lupus pallipes), common jackal (Canis aureus aureus), and red fox (Vulpes vulpes). Felids are Persian leopard (Panthera pardus ciscaucasica), jungle cat (Felis chaus), and Caucasus lynx (Lynx lynx dinniki). Goitered gazelle (Gazella subgutturosa) walk the plains in the southeast. There are also large populations of the globally endangered argali (Ovis ammon).

Notable birds in this ecoregion are honey buzzard (Pernis apivorus), goshawk (Accipiter gentilis), black vulture (Aegypius monachus), bimaculated lark (Melanocorypha bimaculata) and Caspian snowcock (Tetraogallus caspius). Eagles here are the lesser spotted eagle (Aquila pomarina) and the golden eagle (Aquila chrysaetos). The ecoregion is also a breeding area for the little bustard (Tetrax tetrax) and black woodpecker (Dryocopus martius).

== Threats and protected areas ==
Logging and agriculture have reduced the range of the forests in this ecoregion, dams have disrupted river flows, and overgrazing has degraded habitat.

Protected areas with Elburz Range forest steppe in Iran include Golestan National Park and the Ghorkhod Protected Area, both in Golestan Province and totaling 1,260 square kilometres (490 sq mi).

== See also ==
- Temperate coniferous forests
