= Azerbaijan shrub desert and steppe =

Ecoregion in western Asia

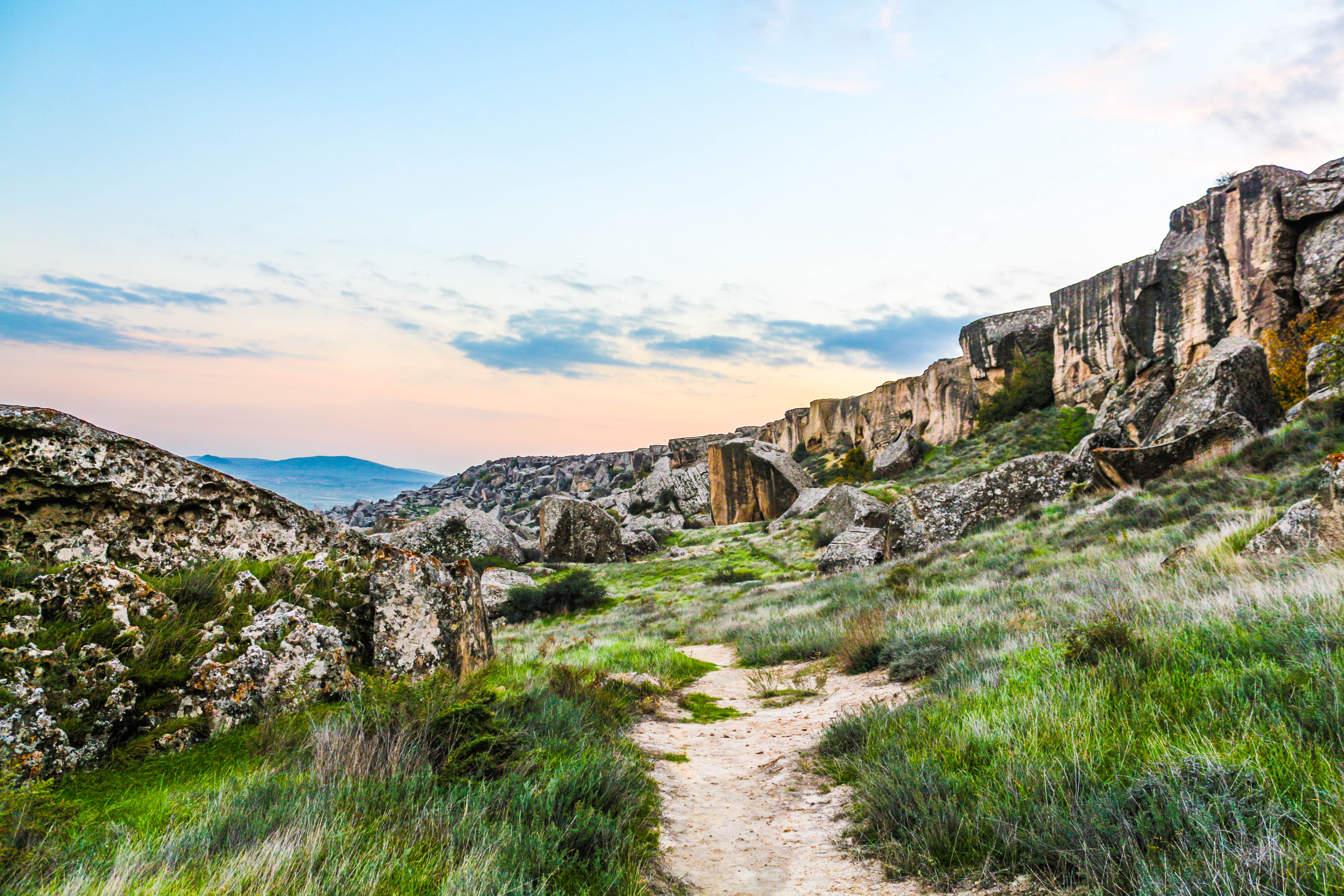
- Landscape in Gobustan State Reserve, Azerbaijan

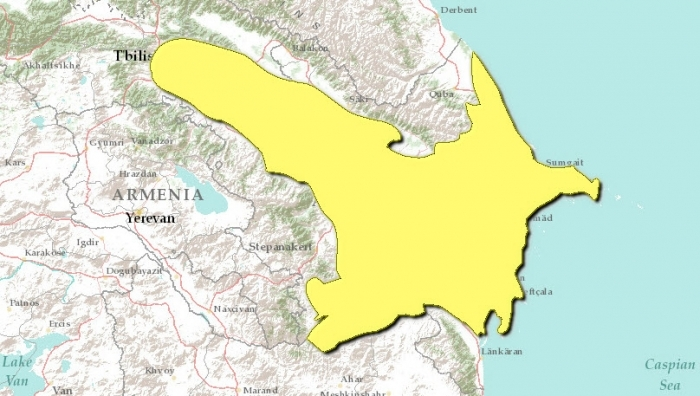
- Location of the ecoregion

Ecology
- Realm: Palearctic
- Biome: deserts and xeric shrublands
- Borders: Caspian Hyrcanian mixed forests; Caucasus mixed forests; Eastern Anatolian montane steppe, Elburz Range forest steppe

Geography
- Area: 64,090 km^{2} (24,750 sq mi)
- Countries: Azerbaijan; Georgia, Iran

Conservation
- Conservation status: Critical/endangered
- Protected: 3,693 km^{2} (6%)

The Azerbaijan shrub desert and steppe is a deserts and xeric shrublands ecoregion in western Asia. It lies in the lowlands west of the Caspian Sea, and covers portions of Azerbaijan, Georgia, and Iran.

== Geography ==
The ecoregion lies mostly in the Kura-Aras Lowland, drained by the Kura River which flows eastward to empty into the Caspian Sea, and its southern tributary the Aras. It is bounded on the north by the Caucasus range, on the west by the Lesser Caucasus, and on the southwest by the Armenian Highlands, on the south by the Elburz Range, and on the east by the Caspian Sea. 70% of the ecoregion is within Azerbaijan, extending into eastern Georgia and northwestern Iran. Elevations range from -27 meters along the shore of the Caspian Sea to 900 meters above sea level.

Baku, Azerbaijan's capital and largest city, is in the ecoregion, as is Tbilisi, Georgia's capital and largest city.

== Climate ==
The climate of the ecoregion is semi-arid to arid, temperate, and continental. The ecoregion has a long, hot summer and a short winter with mild temperatures. Average annual precipitation is 300 to 400 mm.

== Flora ==
The main plant communities include shrub deserts, steppe, open woodlands, riparian forests in river floodplains, and wetlands.

Desert communities are characterized by species of wormwood shrubs (Artemisia), along with other shrubs, grasses, and herbs. Wormwood deserts are dominated by Artemisia lercheana along with the short-lived grasses Poa bulbosa and Catabrosella humilis. Salsola deserts are dominated by the shrubs Salsola nodulosa and Salsola ericoides.

Areas with saline soils are made up of halophytic plants, and are of two are two main types - Salsola dendroides deserts with ephemeral herbs and grasses and Artemisia lercheana, and halophytic wormwood deserts of Artemisia szowitziana with therophytes, including species of Petrosimonia, Climacoptera, Salicornia, and Halimocnemis.

Steppe is characterized by grasses up to one meter high. Bothriochloa ischaemum is the predominant grass, along with species of feather grass (Stipa) and the shrub Paliurus spina-christi.

Dry open woodlands are found in foothills and lower mountain slopes. The predominant trees are three species of juniper (Juniperus) and the deciduous wild pistachio Pistacia atlantica mutica. Understory shrubs include Paliurus spina-christi, Jasminum fruticans, Berberis iberica, Rhamnus pallasii, and Prunus subg. Cerasus spp.

Dominant trees in the floodplain forests include Quercus pedunculiflora, Populus nigra, Populus hybrida, Ulmus carpinifolia, Salix excelsa, and Tilia caucasica, with Tamarix ramosissima and other shrubs in the understory.

== Fauna ==
Native mammals include the Persian gazelle (Gazella subgutturosa subgutturosa) and Turkish hamster (Mesocricetus brandti). The riparian forests support wild boar, gray wolf, roe deer, and Caspian red deer (Cervus elaphus maral).

Native birds include peregrine falcon (Falco peregrinus), chukar partridge (Alectoris chukar), griffon vulture (Gyps fulvus), Cinereous vulture (Aegypius monachus), white-tailed eagle (Haliaeetus albicilla), and black stork (Ciconia nigra). Thousands of little bustards (Tetrax tetrax) winter in the ecoregion's lowlands.

Native reptiles include the Greek tortoise (Testudo graeca), Lebetine viper (Macrovipera lebetina), western sand boa (Eryx jaculus), and Dahl's whip snake (Platyceps najadum).

== Protected areas ==
A 2017 assessment found that 3,693 km^{2}, or 6%, of the ecoregion is in protected areas. Protected areas include Agh-Gol National Park, Gobustan National Park, Shirvan National Park, Korchay State Nature Sanctuary, Shamkir State Nature Sanctuary, and Turyanchay State Nature Reserve in Azerbaijan, and Vashlovani National Park, Vashlovani Strict Nature Reserve, and Gardabani Managed Reserve in Georgia.
