= Hirkan National Park =

National park in Azerbaijan

Hirkan National Park Hirkan Milli Parkı
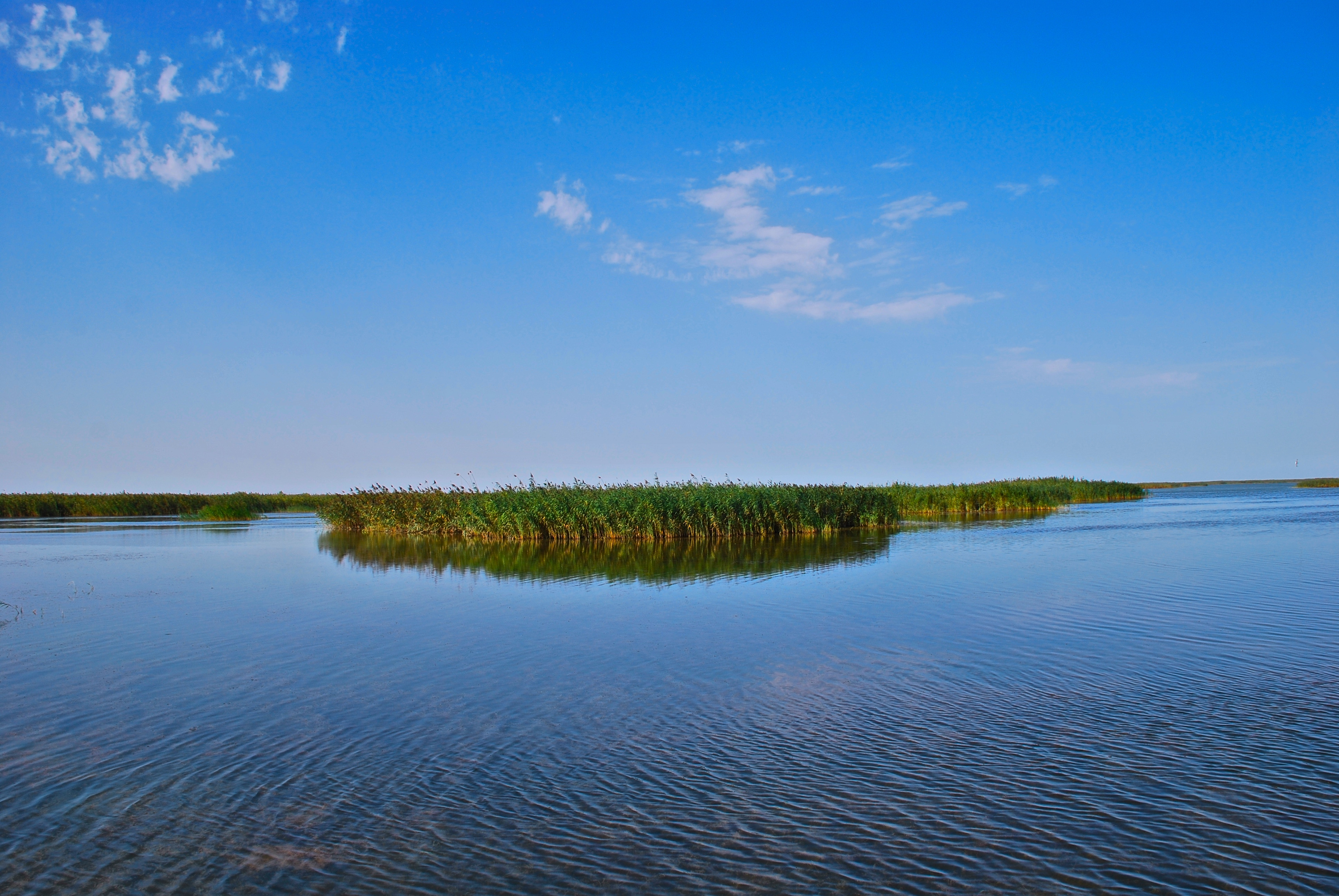

- Location within Azerbaijan
- 38°37′50″N 48°42′42″E
- Location: Lankaran Rayon; Astara Rayon

Site notes
- Area: 40,358 hectares (403.58 km^{2})
- Governing body: Republic of Azerbaijan; Ministry of Ecology and Natural Resources

UNESCO World Heritage Site
- Type: Natural
- Criteria: ix
- Designated: 2019
- Part of: Hyrcanian Forests
- Reference no.: 1584bis-016

Hirkan National Park (Azerbaijani: Hirkan Milli Parkı) is a national park in Azerbaijan, in the Talysh region. It was established in an area in Lankaran Rayon and Astara Rayon administrative districts on February 9, 2004 on the basis of the former "Hirkan State Reserve" which it superseded, on a surface area of 29,760 hectares (297.6 km^{2}). It was enlarged by presidential decree on April 23, 2008 from 29,760 hectares (297.6 km^{2}) to 40,358 hectares (403.58 km^{2}).

The area of Hirkan National Park is 99% covered by forests in a primarily mountainous region, and is strictly protected. It constitutes one of the largest contiguous forests in Azerbaijan, which is not interrupted by any settlement or pasture.

The Hirkan National Park protects the humid subtropical and humid temperate forests in the area of the Lenkoran Lowland and the Talysh Mountains, sheltering many endemic plant and animal species.

The ecosystem of the Hirkan National Park, belongs to the Caspian Hyrcanian (Girkan) mixed forests ecoregion, an area of lush deciduous broadleaved lowland and montane forests (subtropical and temperate rainforests) that completely cover the Talysh Mountains and partially cover the Lankaran Lowland.

== Climate ==
The Hirkan National Park normally has very high humidity and precipitation throughout the year, averaging from 1,400 mm to 1,600 mm per year in the lowlands to 1,800 mm per year in the mountains. The maximum annual precipitation is the highest precipitation in Azerbaijan. The Hirkan National Park has a humid subtropical climate in the lowlands, an oceanic climate in the middle elevations and a humid continental climate on the mountain peaks.

The variety of elevations, the abundant rainfall, and the presence of old growth forests give the park an unusual richness of biota.

== Flora and fauna ==
=== Flora ===
This area preserves many endemic plants species, relicts of the Tertiary period which were not affected by Pliocene and Pleistocene glaciations.

The Caspian Hyrcanian (Girkan) forests account for 150 endemic species of trees and bushes out of 435 species of trees and bushes. Some endemic tree species are, the Hyrcanian box tree (Buxus sempervirens), Caucasian pear (Pyrus communis subsp. caucasica), Lenkoran acacia (Albizia julibrissin), chestnut-leaved oak (Quercus castaneifolia), Caucasian oak (Quercus macranthera), Caucasian ash (Fraxinus angustifolia subsp. oxycarpa), European ash (Fraxinus excelsior), European hornbeam (Carpinus betulus), Oriental hornbeam (Carpinus orientalis), Oriental beech (Fagus orientalis), Caucasian persimmon (Diospyros lotus), Caspian locust tree (Gleditsia caspica), Caucasian alder (Alnus subcordata), black alder (Alnus glutinosa subsp. barbata), white poplar (Populus alba) Caucasian wingnut (Pterocarya fraxinifolia), Persian ironwood (Parrotia persica), Caucasian zelkova (Zelkova carpinifolia), butcher's broom (Ruscus aculeatus), velvet maple (Acer velutinum), Cappadocian maple (Acer cappadocicum), wych elm (Ulmus glabra), Caucasian lime tree (Tilia dasystyla subsp. caucasica), wild cherry (Prunus avium), wild service tree (Torminalis glaberrima), sweet chestnut (Castanea sativa), among many others.

Shrub species occurring in the area include the poet's laurel (Danae racemosa), Hyrcanian holly (Ilex hyrcana), greenbrier (Smilax excelsa), common ivy (Hedera helix), etc.

=== Fauna ===
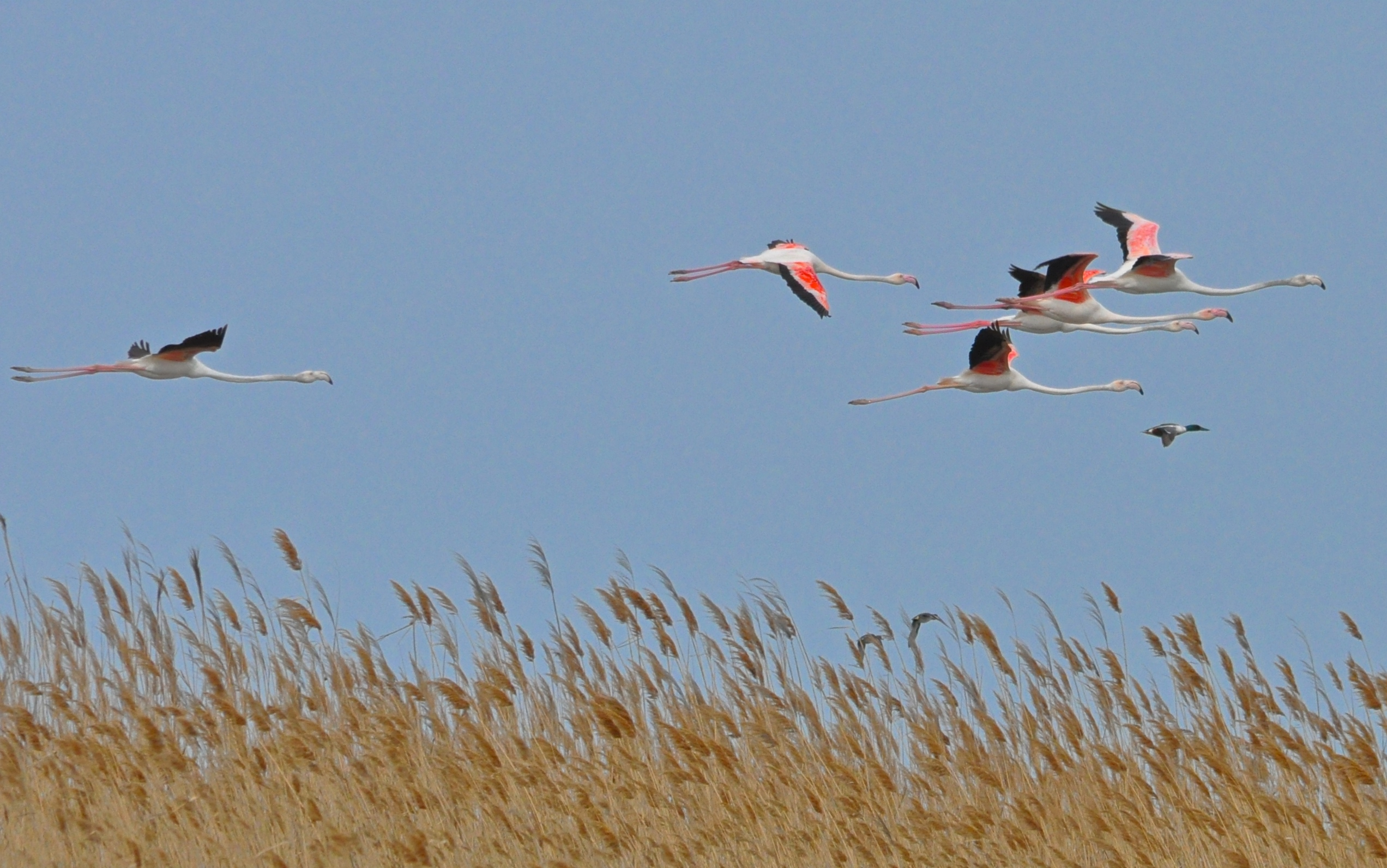
Flamingos in Hirkan National Park

There are several endemic subspecies of birds, of which the Caspian tit (Poecile hyrcanus) and the Caucasus pheasant (Phasianus colchicus colchicus) subspecies of the common pheasant of the Talysh Mountains are common.

The Caspian tiger (Panthera tigris tigris) once roamed these mountains, but is now extinct. Other large mammals here are the Caucasian leopard (Panthera pardus tulliana), lynx (Lynx lynx), brown bear (Ursus arctos), wild boar (Sus scrofa), wolf (Canis lupus), golden jackal (Canis aureus), jungle cat (Felis chaus), red fox (Vulpes vulpes), roe deer (Capreolus capreolus), badger (Meles meles), otter (Lutra lutra), etc.

The Caucasian leopard (Panthera pardus tulliana) subspecies of the leopard, lives in the southern regions in Azerbaijan, primarily in the Talysh Mountains, Nagorno-Karabakh and Nakhichevan. Despite occasional sightings, it was not clear whether leopards had been extinct in Azerbaijan by the late 1990s until a species was caught on camera in March, 2007 in the Hirkan National Park.

== Expansion and reforestation ==
The Hirkan National Park was established in 2004 on the basis of the Hirkan State Reserve which it superseded, on a surface area of 29,760 hectares (297.6 km^{2}), it was enlarged in 2008 to 40,358 hectares (403.58 km^{2}).

The plain part of the Hirkan National Park ("Moscow Forest") lies within the Lankaran Lowland. The Moscow Forest is the only preserved part of the Caspian Hyrcanian mixed forests which covered most of the lowland, that was later cleared for agriculture. However, there is a reforestation program of the lowland, on a designated non-forested lot which is the only non-cultivated land on the plain, in order to (partially because the Lankaran Lowland is far too valuable for its agricultural productivity for Azerbaijan, to be given up for reforestation) restore the ecology to its previous forested state. This lot will become the second forest in the lowland after the Moscow Forest and once it is reforested, it will become an additional part of the Hirkan National Park in the lowland.

== UNESCO Status Application ==
For the purpose of including the Hirkan National Park and the Caspian Hyrcanian (Girkan) forests respectively into UNESCO's World Heritage Site list of cultural and natural heritage and Biosphere Reserves Programme, documents substantiated from the scientific point of view have been prepared and introduced to the UNESCO Secretariat.

== Philately ==
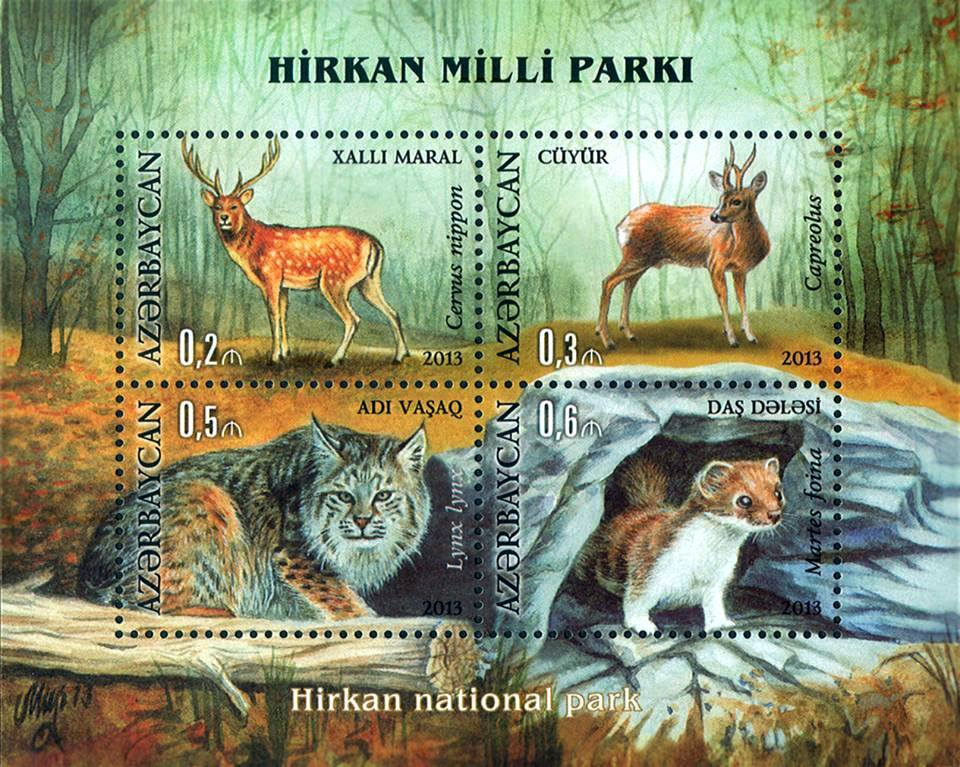
Stamps of Azerbaijan, 2013

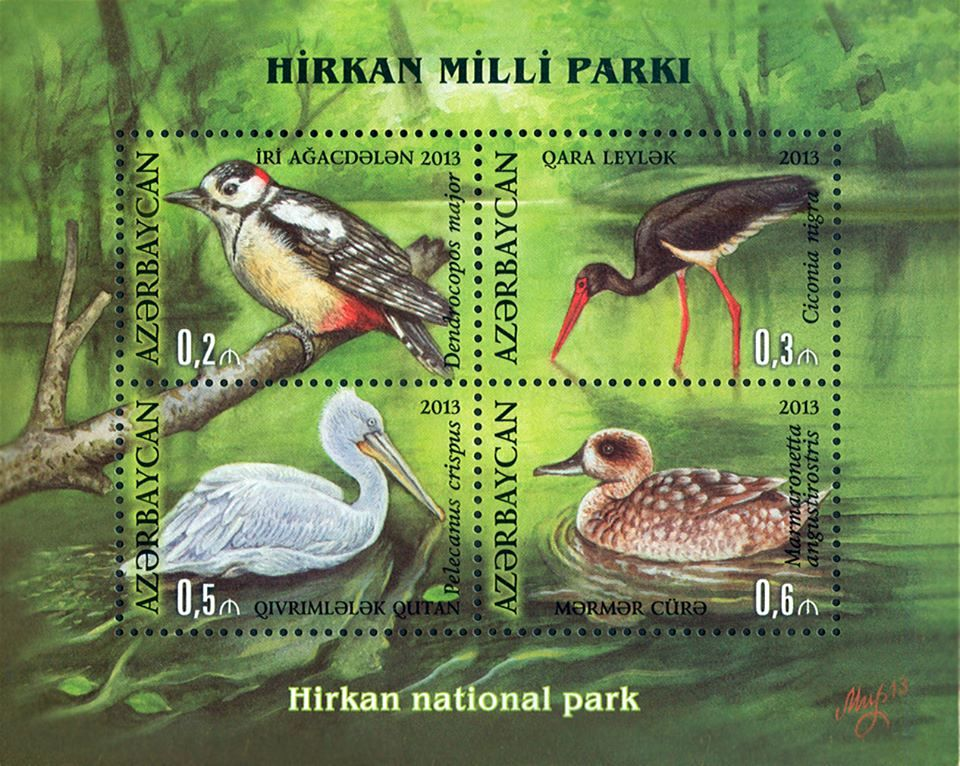
Stamps of Azerbaijan, 2013

== See also ==
- Caspian Hyrcanian mixed forests
- Nature of Azerbaijan
- National Parks of Azerbaijan
- State Reserves of Azerbaijan
- State Game Reserves of Azerbaijan
