= Hyrcanian forests =

Ecoregion in Iran and Azerbaijan

Caspian Hyrcanian mixed forests
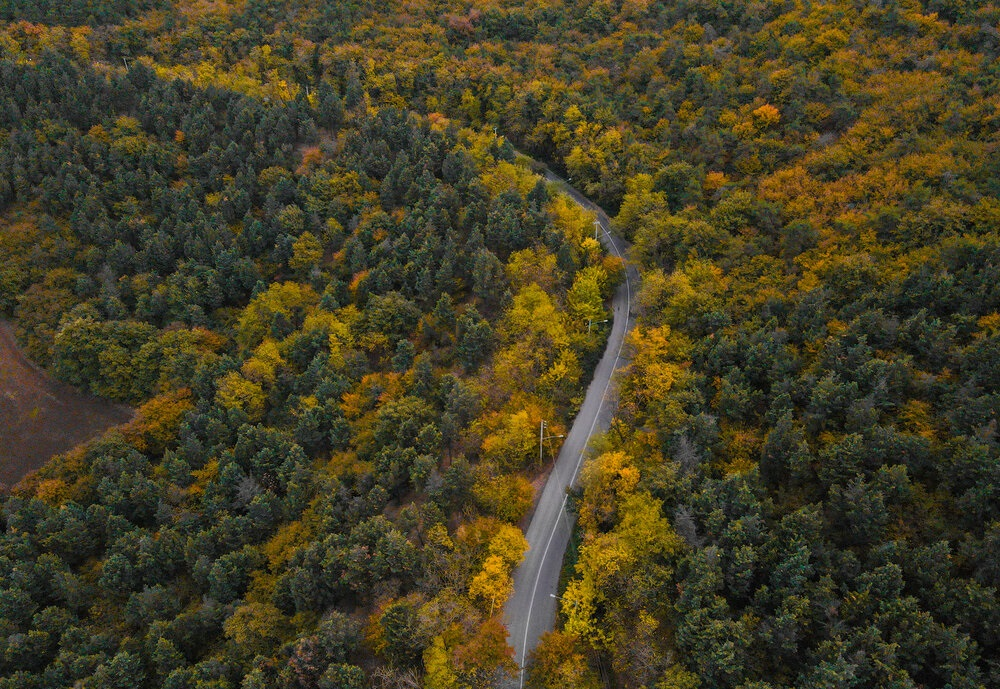
- Sisangan National Forest, Mazandaran Iran

- Hyrcanian mixed forests (purple)

Ecology
- Biome: Temperate broadleaf and mixed forests
- Borders: List: Caspian lowland desert; Kopet Dag semi-desert; Kopet Dag woodlands and forest steppe; Elburz Range forest steppe; Eastern Anatolian montane steppe; Azerbaijan shrub desert and steppe
- Bird species: 296
- Mammal species: 98

Geography
- Area: 55,100 km^{2} (21,300 mi^{2})
- Countries: Iran; Azerbaijan

Conservation
- Habitat loss: 51%
- Protected: 10.30%

UNESCO World Heritage Site
- Official name: Hyrcanian Forests
- Criteria: Natural: (ix)
- Designated: 2019 (43rd session)
- Reference no.: 1584
- Region: Western Asia, Caucasus
- Area: 129,485 ha
- Buffer Zone: 177,129 ha

The Hyrcanian forests (Persian: جنگل‌های هیرکانی; Azerbaijani: Hirkan meşələri) are a zone of lush lowland and montane forests covering about 55,000 square kilometres (21,000 mi^{2}) near the shores of the Caspian Sea in Iran and Azerbaijan. The forest is named after the ancient region of Hyrcania. The World Wide Fund for Nature refers to the ecoregion as the Caspian Hyrcanian mixed forests. Since 5 July 2019, the Hyrcanian Forests have been designated a UNESCO World Heritage Site. In September 2023, the heritage site expanded to incorporate portions of the forest located in Azerbaijan.

== Geography ==
In Iran, the Hyrcanian ecoregion comprises a long strip along the southern coast of the Caspian Sea and the northern slopes of the Alborz mountains. It covers parts of five provinces, from east to west: North Khorasan, Golestan (421,373 hectares (1,041,000 acres) being its south and southwest plus eastern regions of the Gorgan plain), Mazandaran, Gilan and Ardabil.

The Golestan National Park spans the boundary of Golestan and Mazandaran provinces. In the Mazandaran province, where the Hyrcanian forest is estimated at 965,000 ha (3,730 mi^{2}), 487,195 ha (1,881 mi^{2}) are used commercially, 184,000 ha (710 mi^{2}) are protected and the rest are regarded as forest lands or over-used forests. The total of the forest woods used in this province is estimated at 770,551 cubic metres (27,211,800 ft^{3}). The Kojoor, Dohezar and Sehezar forest watersheds are in Mazandaran province, Gilan province (these forests are graded from 1 to 3 with an area of 107,894 ha (417 mi^{2}); 182,758 ha (706 mi^{2}) and 211,972 ha (818 mi^{2}), respectively. The commercial utilization is 184,202 m^{3} (6,505,000 ft^{3}) and the non-commercial utilization is 126,173 m^{3} (4,455,800 ft^{3}). The Masooleh, Ghaleh Roodkhan and Astara forest watersheds are in Gilan province) and Ardabil Province. At higher elevations to the south, the ecoregion grades into the Elburz Range forest steppe.

In southeastern Azerbaijan the ecoregion spans through the Lankaran Lowland and the Talysh Mountains.

The ecoregion's climate is humid subtropical at lower altitudes; at mid-altitudes it has oceanic features, while in the mountains it is humid continental. Summer is a humid but low-precipitation season. Alborz is the highest mountain range in the Middle East and it captures, by relief precipitation and dew point mists, much of the evaporation of the southern Caspian Sea. Annual rainfall ranges from 900 mm (35 in) in the east to 1,600 mm (63 in) in the west, making the forests much lusher than the desert, semi-desert, and steppe regions which it borders.

== Flora ==
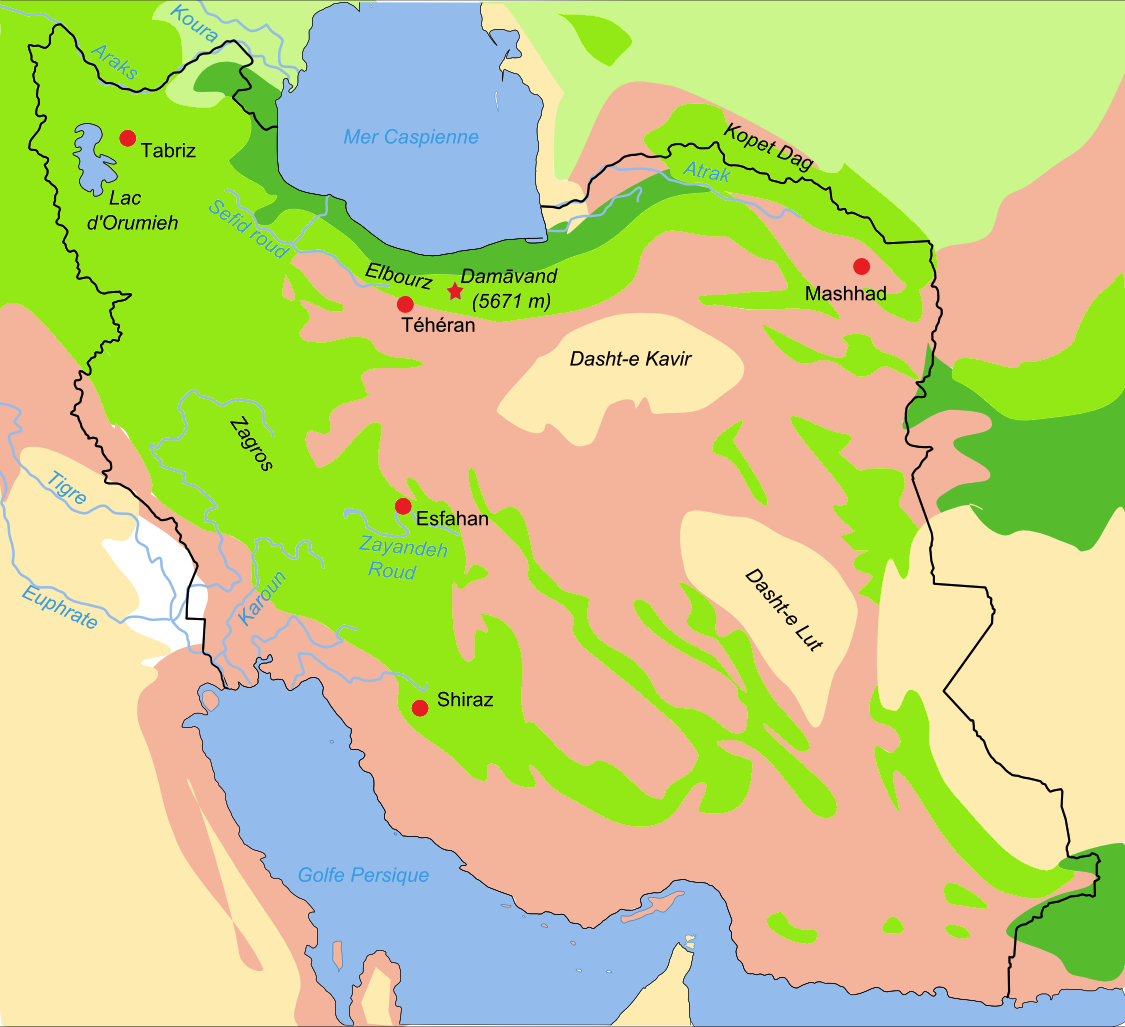
Map of biotopes of Iran Forest steppe Forests and woodlands Semi-desert Desert lowlands Steppe Salted alluvial marshes

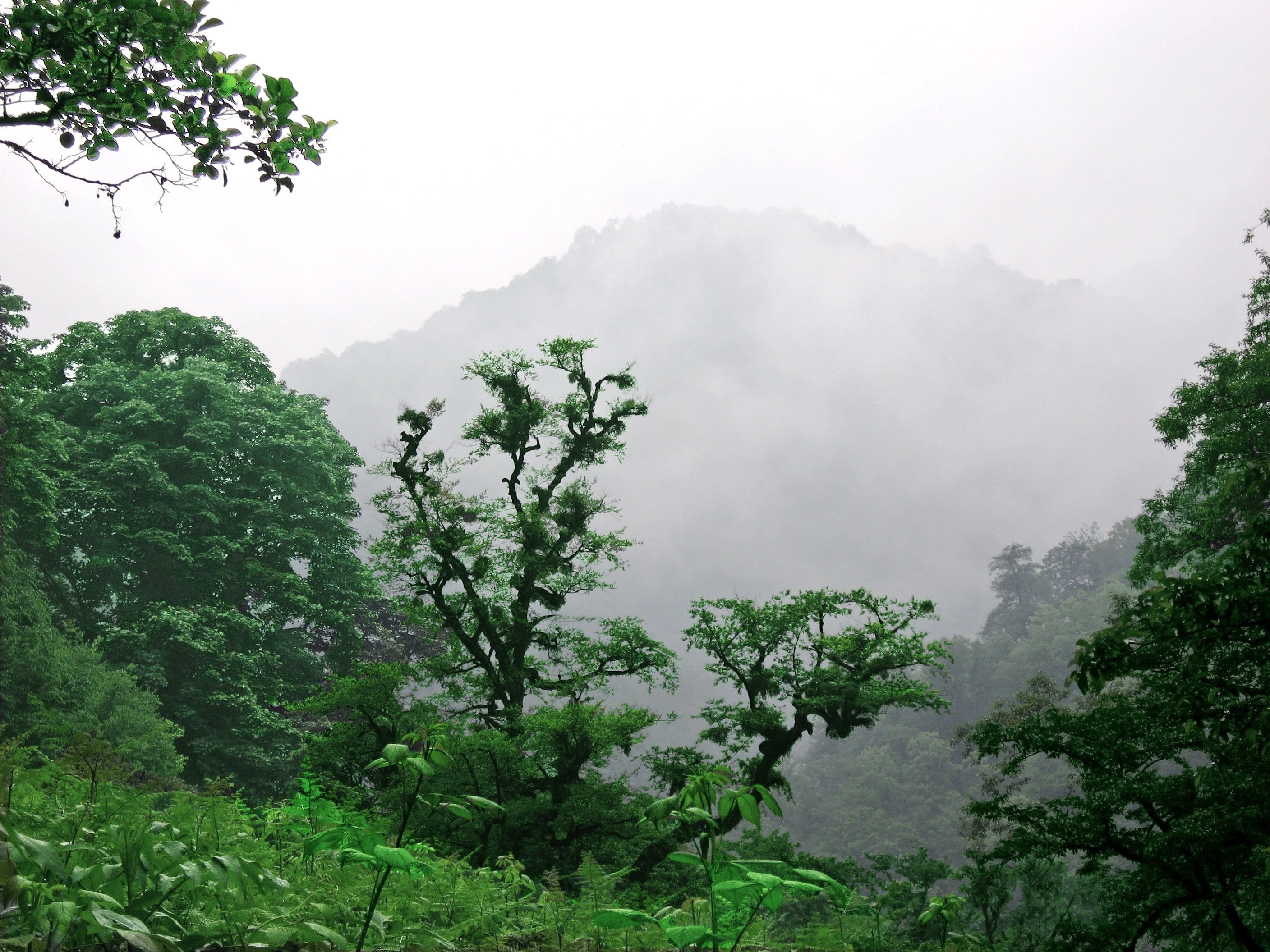
Hyrcanian broadleaf deciduous forest in Gīlān Province, Iran

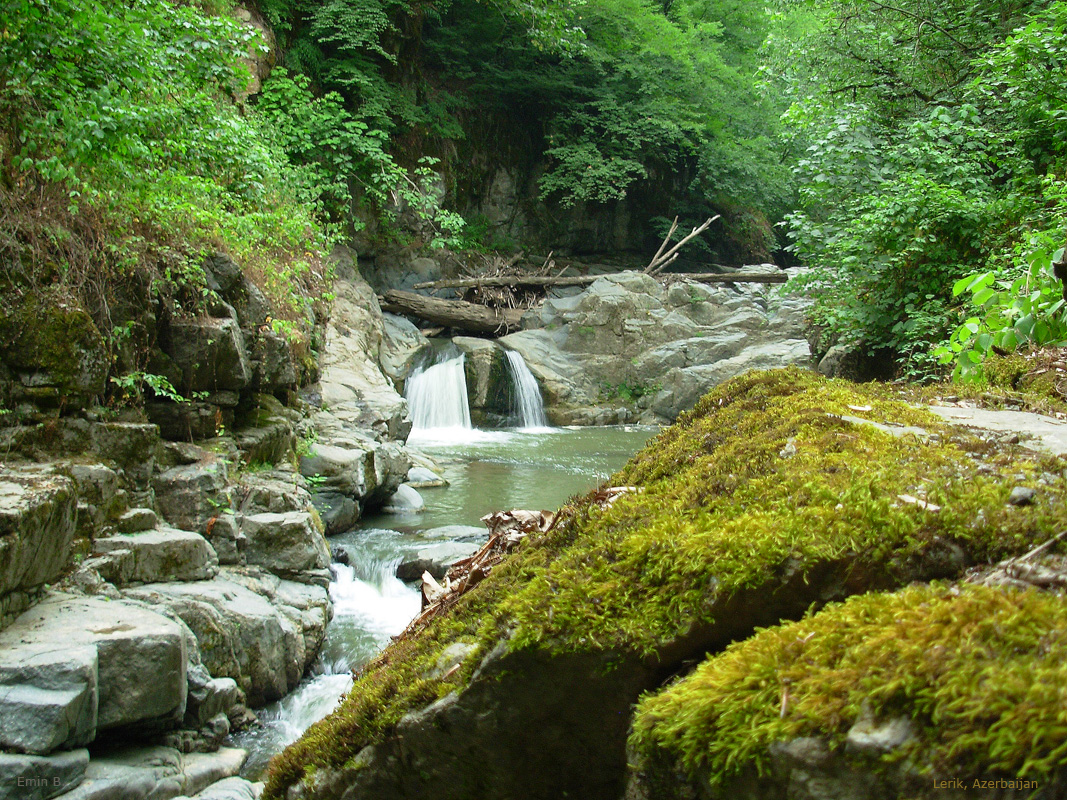
Hyrcanian broadleaf deciduous forest in Lerik District, Azerbaijan

The natural forest vegetation is temperate deciduous broadleaved forest. 32.7 percent of volume of Hyrcanian forest is of oriental beech (Fagus orientalis). A main feature of the region is the lack of conifers; only relics of coniferous species are present, which include European yew (Taxus baccata), junipers (Juniperus spp.), Mediterranean cypress (Cupressus sempervirens var. horzontalis) and Chinese arborvitae (Platycladus orientalis).

The Caspian Sea coastal plains were once covered by chestnut-leaved oak (Quercus castaneifolia), European box (Buxus sempervirens), black alder (Alnus glutinosa subsp. barbata), Caucasian alder (Alnus subcordata), Caspian poplar (Populus alba var. caspica) and Caucasian wingnut (Pterocarya fraxinifolia), but these forests have been almost entirely converted to urban and agricultural land. (Mosadegh, 2000; Marvie Mohadjer, 2007)

The lower slopes of Talysh and Alborz Mountains below 700 metres (2,300 ft) harbor diverse humid forests containing chestnut-leaved oak, European hornbeam (Carpinus betulus), Persian ironwood (Parrotia persica), Caucasian zelkova (Zelkova carpinifolia), Persian silk tree (Albizia julibrissin), and date-plum (Diospyros lotus) along with shrubs holly (Ilex hyrcana), Ruscus hyrcanus, Danae racemosa and Atropa pallidiflora, and lianas Smilax excelsa and Hedera pastuchovii (Mosadegh, 2000; Marvie Mohadjer, 2007). Persian Ironwood is endemic to the Talysh Mountains and northern Iran and nearly pure stands of the tree can be particularly dramatic, with lichen-covered branches twisting together and only dead leaves in the deep shade of the forest floor. In addition, the ironwood's yellow leaves turn a faint lilac in the fall.

At the medium elevations between 700 and 1,500 metres (2,300 and 4,900 ft), oriental beech is the dominant tree species in this cloudy zone in pure and mixed stands with other noble hardwoods such as chestnut-leaved oak, Caucasian oak (Quercus macranthera), European hornbeam (Carpinus betulus), Oriental hornbeam (C. orientalis) and sweet chestnut (Castanea sativa). From its floristic composition, these beech forests are linked with European forests and with affinities to the beech forests of the Balkans. However, local conditions of aspect and edaphic factors, such as soil moisture and depth, are all of importance in determining the composition of the vegetation, which leads to the establishment of different beech subcommunities. (Mosadegh, 2000; Marvie Mohadjer, 2007)

Upper mountain and subalpine zones are characterized by Caucasian oak, Oriental hornbeam, shrublands and steppes. Alpine tundra and meadows occur at the highest elevations.

Other native tree species include Caspian locust (Gleditsia caspica), velvet maple (Acer velutinum), Cappadocian maple (Acer cappadocicum), European ash (Fraxinus excelsior), Wych elm (Ulmus glabra), wild cherry (Prunus avium), wild service tree (Sorbus torminalis) and lime tree (Tilia platyphyllos).

In recent years, the Hyrcanian ecosystem has faced severe biological threats, notably the widespread infestation of the box tree moth (Cydalima perspectalis) and box blight (Calonectria pseudonaviculata). These invasive pressures have led to significant dieback of the endemic Hyrcanian boxwood (Buxus hyrcana) stands across northern Iran.

== Fauna ==
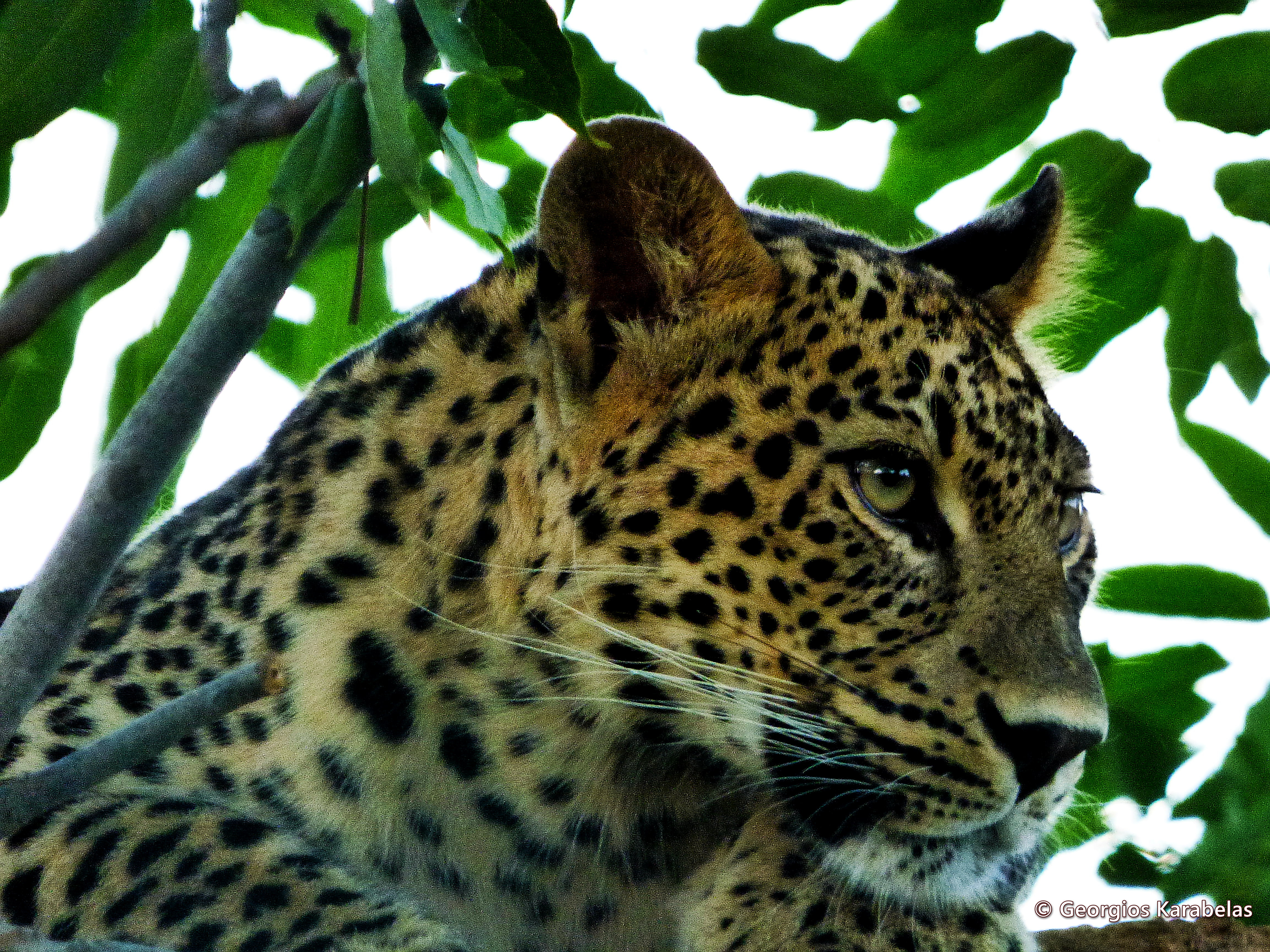
The Persian Leopard, found mostly in Iran

The Caspian tiger (Panthera tigris tigris) was once the apex predator of the biome before its extinction. The remaining large mammals include the Persian/Caucasian leopard (Panthera pardus tulliana), Eurasian lynx (Lynx lynx), brown bear (Ursus arctos), wild boar (Sus scrofa), wolf (Canis lupus), golden jackal (Canis aureus), jungle cat (Felis chaus), Caucasian badger (Meles canescens), and Eurasian otter (Lutra lutra).

This ecoregion is the main green resting area for birds migrating between central-northern Russia and Africa and thus is a key habitat for many bird species. Notable birds seen here are the greylag goose (Anser anser), white-fronted goose (Anser albifrons), little bustard (Tetrax tetrax), glossy ibis (Plegadis falcinellus), Eurasian spoonbill (Platalea leucorodia), night heron (Nycticorax nycticorax), red-breasted goose (Branta ruficollis), peregrine falcon (Falco peregrinus), Dalmatian pelican (Pelecanus crispus), cattle egret (Bubulcus ibis), squacco heron (Ardeola ralloides), greater flamingo (Phoenicopterus roseus), white-headed duck (Oxyura leucocephala), and Caspian snowcock (Tetraogallus caspius).

=== Endemic species ===
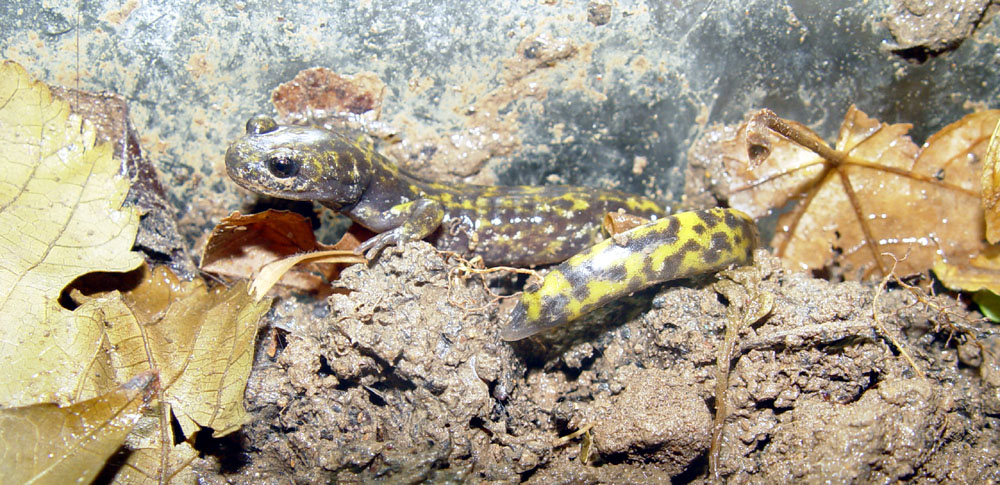
An adult Persian mountain salamander, found only in the Hyrcanian forest region

The Hyrcanian forests are thought to have served as a refugium for certain species during changing climatic conditions. The Iranian edible dormouse (Glis persicus) is an endemic of this ecoregion, and is thought to have evolved when mid-Miocene climatic change led to the fragmentation of the ancestral Glis population, with one such population fragment surviving in these forests and evolving into a new species. The bat Myotis hyrcanicus is likely also endemic to this region. The region is also known to preserve a unique lineage of bicolored shrew (Crocidura leucodon) that diverged from the other lineages during the mid-Pleistocene, about 1 million years ago. The Persian mountain salamander (Paradactylodon persicus) is an aquatic salamander endemic to high rainfall regions of the Hyrcanian forest. It is primarily known from its aquatic larvae which live in permanent streams with forest cover. This is a very understudied species and very few adults have ever been found. It is under threat from habitat loss due to logging, agricultural development, and urban sprawl.

== Protected areas ==
The diversity and endemism of the species make the Caspian Hyrcanian forests a priority and unique feature for species conservation. Habitats are threatened by conversion into tea, vegetable, fruit, and vine plantations, unsustainable forestry and poaching.

The Caspian forests were nationalized in the 1960s as part of state-led environmental and land management policies. Following this measure, inhabitants of the forested zones—primarily pastoral communities whose livelihoods depended on cattle grazing, seasonal mobility, and access to woodland resources—were compelled by government authorities to relocate to nearby settled villages. This resettlement policy effectively ended long-standing patterns of forest habitation and traditional pastoral land use, transforming both the social organization of these communities and their relationship to the forest landscape.

Protected areas in Azerbaijan include:

- Gizil-Agach State Reserve – 88.4 square kilometres (34.1 mi^{2})
- Hirkan National Park - 427.97 square kilometres (165.24 mi^{2})

Protected areas in Iran include:

- Golestan National Park
- Jahan Nama Protected Area
- Central Alborz Protected Area
- Lisar Protected Area
- Siah Keshim Protected Area
- Dodangeh Wildlife Refuge
- Neka Miankaleh Wildlife Refuge
- Selkeh Wildlife Refuge
- Dashtenaz Wildlife Refuge

== See also ==
- Hyrcania
- Geography of Iran
- Geography of Azerbaijan
- List of World Heritage Sites in Western Asia
