= Eastern Anatolian montane steppe =

Ecoregion in western Asia

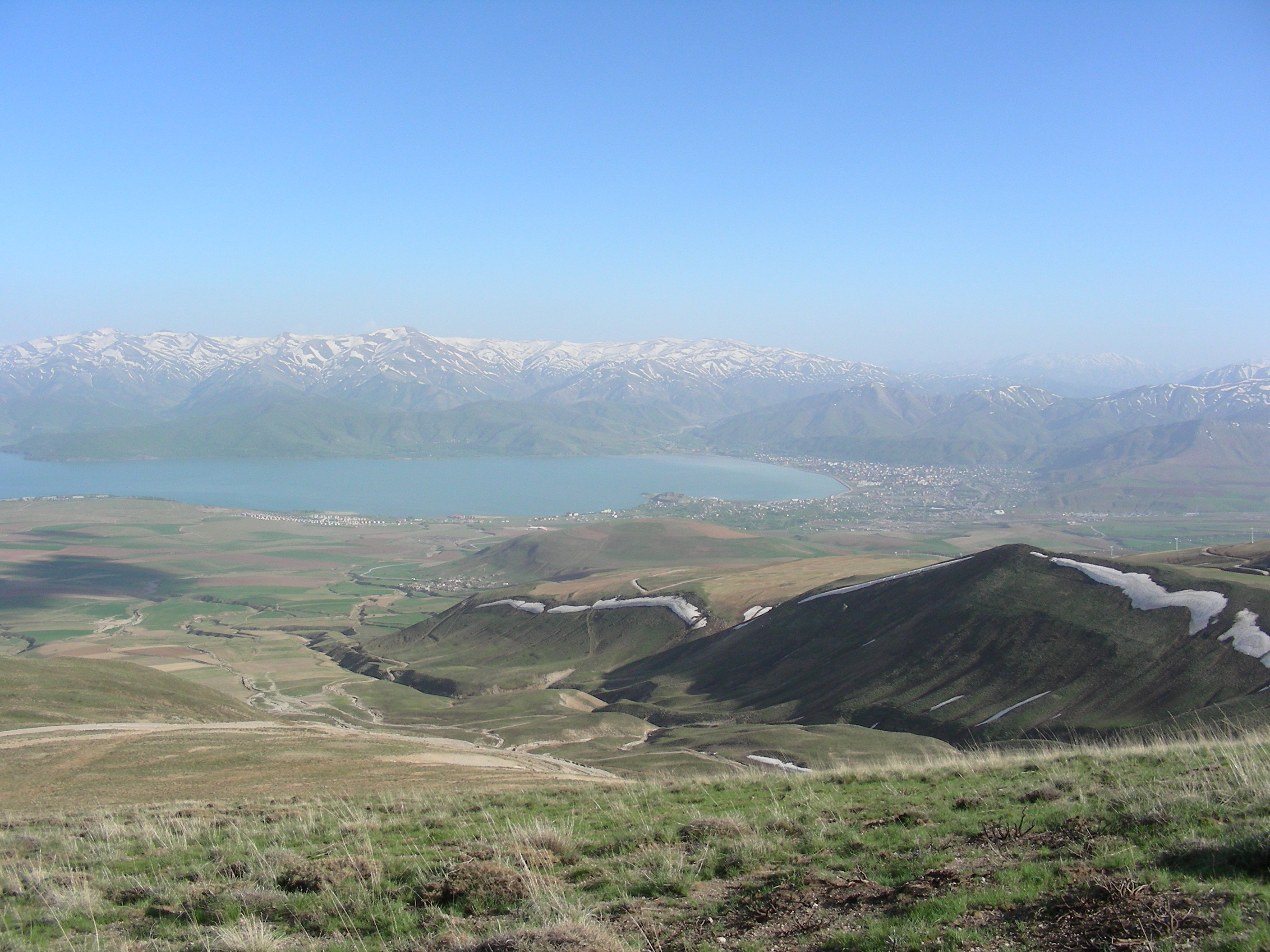
- Landscape overlooking Lake Van in eastern Turkey

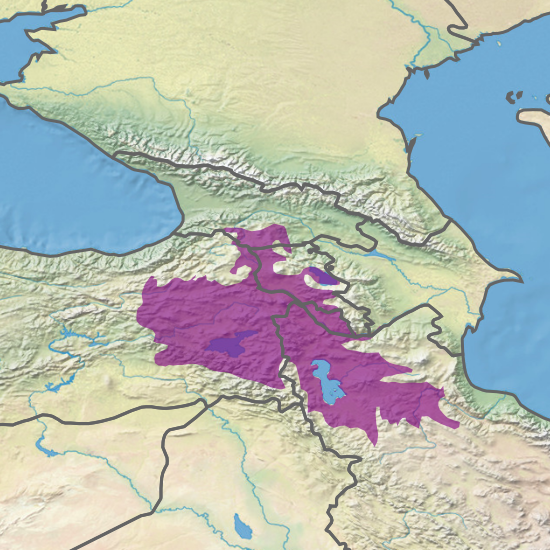
- Ecoregion territory (in purple)

Ecology
- Realm: Palearctic
- Biome: temperate grasslands, savannas, and shrublands
- Borders: List: Caspian Hyrcanian mixed forests; Caucasus mixed forests; Eastern Anatolian deciduous forests; Eastern Mediterranean conifer-sclerophyllous-broadleaf forests; Elburz Range forest steppe; Zagros Mountains forest-steppe

Geography
- Area: 168,381 km^{2} (65,012 sq mi)
- Countries: List: Armenia; Azerbaijan; Georgia; Iran; Turkey

Conservation
- Conservation status: Critical/endangered
- Protected: 8,202 km^{2} (5%)

The Eastern Anatolian montane steppe is a temperate grasslands, savannas, and shrublands ecoregion. It is located in the Armenian Highlands, covering parts of eastern Turkey, Armenia, Azerbaijan, southern Georgia, and northwestern Iran.

== Geography ==
The ecoregion occupies the Armenian Highlands, a plateau lying mostly between 1500 and 2500 meters elevation. The volcanic peaks Mount Ararat (5137 m) and Mount Süphan (4058 m) rise above the plateau. It covers portions of eastern Turkey, western and southern Armenia, Azerbaijan's Nakhchivan Autonomous Republic, the Javakheti region of southern Georgia, and northwestern Iran. The highlands are bounded on the northeast by the Lesser Caucasus, on the northwest by the Pontic Mountains, and on the south by the Zagros Mountains. To the east the plateau descends towards the Aras-Kura lowlands, and in the Aras valley the ecoregion descends to 375 meters elevation.

The northern part of the ecoregion is in the watershed of the upper Aras River, which includes Lake Sevan in Armenia. The Aras empties into the Kura River, which then drains into the Caspian Sea. The ecoregion includes closed basins of Lake Van in eastern Turkey and Lake Urmia in northwestern Iran.

The cities of Tabriz, Erzurum, and Yerevan are located in the ecoregion.

== Climate ==
The climate is continental, with warm summers and cold winters. Annual precipitation ranges from 400 to 600 mm, and generally falls evenly throughout the year. Rainfall is lower (200–300 mm annually) in the rain shadow of the high mountains. Strong and cold winds are frequent, particularly on exposed ridges and peaks, and can limit the growth of trees.

== Flora ==
An example; Flora of the south of the Akdoğan Mountains, Erzurum plateau. Qûçan region is completely brown soil. Other places are semi-brown and consist of different types of soil.

Plant communities include desert steppe, semi-desert steppe, mountain steppe, woodland, alpine, and wetlands.

Desert steppe is found in the driest areas, and consists of low xerophytic plants covering 25-30% of the ground. The semi-desert steppe consists of low annual herbs and grasses, including Artemisia fragrans, Capparis spinosa, Bassia prostrata, and Poa bulbosa.

Mountain steppes consist of herbs, shrubs, and grasses, which grow higher and are more diverse than the desert and semi-desert steppes. From 1500 to 2200 meters elevation, the main plant associations are cushion-like formations of Artemisia austriaca and Artemisia fragrans or species of Astragalus, Acantholimon, and Onobrychis, or grasslands of Poa bulbosa and species of Stipa, Festuca, and Bassia. From 2200 to 2700 meters elevation, umbellifers of genera Ferula and Prangos are common.

Open steppe woodlands are predominantly of juniper (Juniperus) and almond. The trees form a sparse canopy, underneath which is a shrub layer of Pistacia, Berberis, and Rosa, and an herb layer with species of Astragalus and Artemisia. Scattered areas of oak woodland occur between 800 and 2000 meters elevation where moisture and soils are favorable.

Wetlands occur around the ecoregion's lakes and streams. Wetland vegetation is predominantly reeds and rushes, including common reed (Phragmites australis), cattails (Typha spp.), the rush Scirpus tabernaemontani, and the sedges Carex acuta, C. diluta, and Bolboschoenus maritimus.

Alpine plant communities are found on the high peaks, including Ararat and Süphan. Characteristic plants are herbs and geophytes, with species of Draba, Dracocephalum, Oxyria, Polygonum, Veronica, Trollius, Scilla, Primula, and Gentiana verna.

== Fauna ==
Large mammals include brown bear (Ursus arctos), gray wolf (Canis lupus), striped hyena (Hyena hyena), and wild goat (Capra aegagrus).

== Protected areas ==
A 2017 assessment found that 8,202 km^{2}, or 5%, of the ecoregion is in protected areas. Protected areas include Charoimagh Protected Area, Sahand Protected Area, Marakan Protected Area, and Kiamaky Wildlife Refuge in Iran, Sevan National Park, Lake Arpi National Park, and Khosrov Forest State Reserve in Armenia, Mount Ararat (Ağrı Dağı) National Park, Süphan Dağı and Lake Akdoğan in Turkey, and Arpachay State Nature Sanctuary in Azerbaijan.
