= Caucasus mixed forests =

Ecoregion

Coordinates: 41.75°N 44.25°E

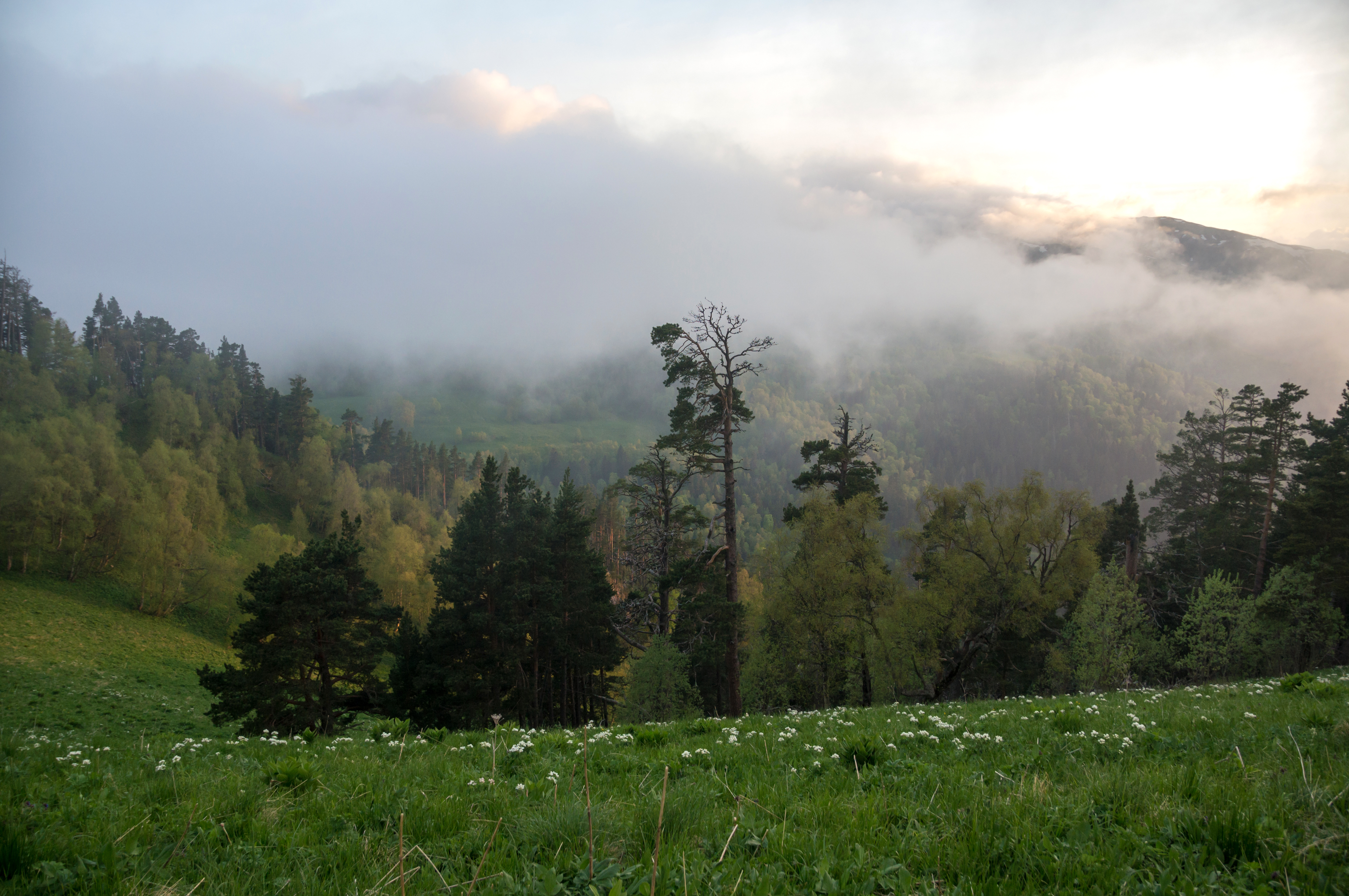
- Shisha River Canyon in Caucasus Nature Reserve, Adygea, Russia

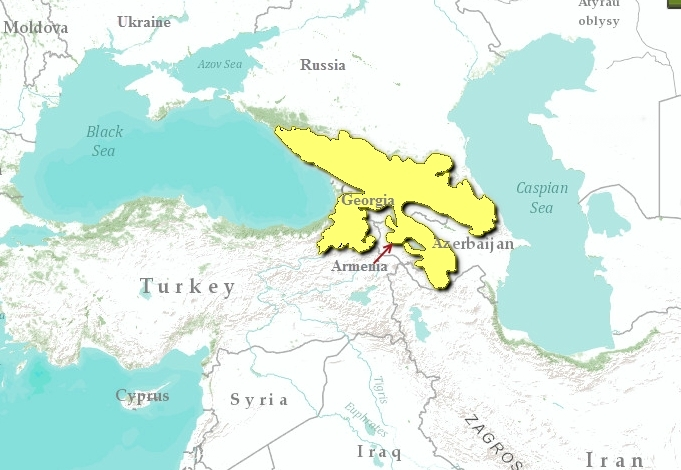
- Ecoregion territory (encircled in magenta)

Ecology
- Realm: Palearctic
- Biome: temperate broadleaf and mixed forests
- Borders: List: Azerbaijan shrub desert and steppe; Crimean Submediterranean forest complex; Eastern Anatolian montane steppe; Euxine-Colchic broadleaf forests; Northern Anatolian conifer and deciduous forests; Pontic steppe

Geography
- Area: 170,405 km^{2} (65,794 sq mi)
- Countries: List: Armenia; Azerbaijan; Georgia; Iran; Russia; Turkey

Conservation
- Conservation status: Critical/endangered
- Protected: 30,540 km^{2} (18%)

The Caucasus mixed forests is a temperate broadleaf and mixed forests ecoregion in the Caucasus Mountains, as well as the adjacent Lesser Caucasus range and the eastern end of the Pontic Mountains.

== Geography ==
The ecoregion covers an area of 170,405 square kilometers (65,794 sq mi), extending across portions of Armenia, Azerbaijan, Georgia, Iran, Russia, and Turkey. The main Caucasus chain, known as the Greater Caucasus, run from northwest to southeast, extending from north of the Black Sea eastwards to the Caspian Sea. The Caucasus forms the traditional border between Europe and Asia. The highest point in the Caucasus is Mount Elbrus (5,642 m). The ecoregion also includes the Lesser Caucasus or Anti-Caucasus range, which lies south of the Caucasus, as well as the eastern end of the Pontic Mountains, which extends along the southern shore of the Black Sea.

== Climate ==
The climate is temperate to continental, and varies with elevation. Average annual rainfall is generally higher in the western portion of the ecoregion, ranging from 1500 to 2000 mm in the western ranges along the Black Sea, to 600 to 1000 mm at the eastern and southern portions of the range.

== Flora ==
The ecoregion's plant communities vary with elevation.

Temperate mixed forests extend from 400 to 2200 meters elevation, covering about 70% of the ecoregion's area. Broadleaf trees are predominant at lower elevations, transitioning to conifer-dominated forests at higher elevations.

Between 400 and 1000 meters elevation, Georgian oak (Quercus iberica), European hornbeam (Carpinus betulus), Quercus robur, Quercus petraea, Picea abies, Abies alba, Alnus glutinosa, Fagus sylvatica, Taxus baccata, Acer pseudoplatanus, Malus sylvestris, Viburnum lantana, Fraxinus excelsior, Tilia cordata, Aesculus hippocastanum, Rhamnus cathartica, Ulmus glabra, Ulmus minor, Populus alba, Pinus sylvestris, Betula pendula, Populus tremula, and Corylus avellana, are the dominant trees, along with sweet chestnut (Castanea sativa) in the more humid western mountains. Oriental beech (Fagus orientalis), Picea abies, Abies alba, Alnus glutinosa, Fagus sylvatica, Taxus baccata, Pinus sylvestris, Betula pendula, Populus tremula, Juniperus communis, and Corylus avellana is dominant between 1000 and 1500 meters elevation, with Caucasian oak (Quercus macranthera) dominant in drier areas.

Conifers become dominant above 1500 meters elevation, including Nordmann fir (Abies nordmanniana), Caucasian spruce (Picea orientalis), and Caucasian pine (Pinus sylvestris var. hamata). Dwarf forests occur near the treeline at 1800 to 2000 meters elevation, mostly of birches (Betula pubescens var. litwinowii and Betula raddeana) in more humid areas, and oriental oak and Caucasian pine in drier areas.

Subalpine grasslands occur from 1800 to 2500 meters elevation, and alpine meadows from 2500 to 3000 meters, interspersed with thickets of Rhododendron caucasicum between 2000 and 2800 meters, and areas of rock scree. Sub-nival plants and lichens grow from 3000 to 4000 meters elevation.

== Fauna ==
Large hoofed mammals include the East Caucasian tur (Capra cylindricornis), West Caucasian tur (Capra caucasica), Caucasian chamois (Rupicapra rupicapra caucasica), mouflon (Ovis orientalis gmelini), Caspian red deer (Cervus elaphus maral), and wild goat (Capra aegagrus). The East Caucasian Tur and West Caucasian Tur are endemic to the eastern and western portions of the Caucasus Mountains, respectively. Large mammal predators include the Eurasian brown bear (Ursus arctos arctos), wolf (Canis lupus), and Caucasus leopard (Panthera pardus tulliana).

The ecoregion is home to the raptors golden eagle (Aquila chrysaetos) and lammergeier (Gypaetus barbatus). Other resident birds include the Caucasian grouse (Lyrurus mlokosiewiczi), Caucasian snowcock (Tetraogallus caucasicus), great rosefinch (Carpodacus rubicilla), and Güldenstädt's redstart (Phoenicurus erythrogaster). Native water birds include the gadwall (Mareca strepera), whooper swan (Cygnus cygnus), common pochard (Aythya ferina), greater scaup (Aythya marila), common goldeneye (Bucephala clangula), and Dalmatian pelican (Pelicanus crispus).

== Protected areas ==
A 2017 assessment found that 30,540 km^{2}, or 18%, of the ecoregion is in protected areas. Protected areas include the Lagodekhi Protected Areas, Borjomi-Kharagauli and Tusheti National Parks, Zagatala State Reserve, and Caucasus Biosphere Reserve.
