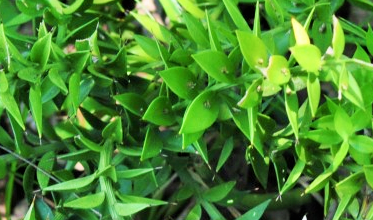
- Aerial parts of the plant

Scientific classification
- Kingdom: Plantae
- Clade: Tracheophytes
- Clade: Angiosperms
- Clade: Monocots
- Order: Asparagales
- Family: Asparagaceae
- Subfamily: Convallarioideae
- Genus: Ruscus
- Species: R. hyrcanus

Binomial name
- Ruscus hyrcanus Woronow (1907)

= Ruscus hyrcanus =

Species of plant

Ruscus hyrcanus is a perennial evergreen woody shrub-like or small compact bush plant. It is in the asparagus family.

== Description and habitat ==
The species grows to approximately 30–50 cm (12–20 in) tall and is very prickly. Stems always are green; ordinary woody, rigid, branched at the end in a whorl with spreading-procumbent branches. Cladodes have a length of 10–25 mm (0.4–1 in); they are flattened, ovate, lanceolate, leathery, rigid, and tapering to a thorn at their extremity; their both sides are shiny green. R. hyrcanus leaves are very reduced, small and bractiform.

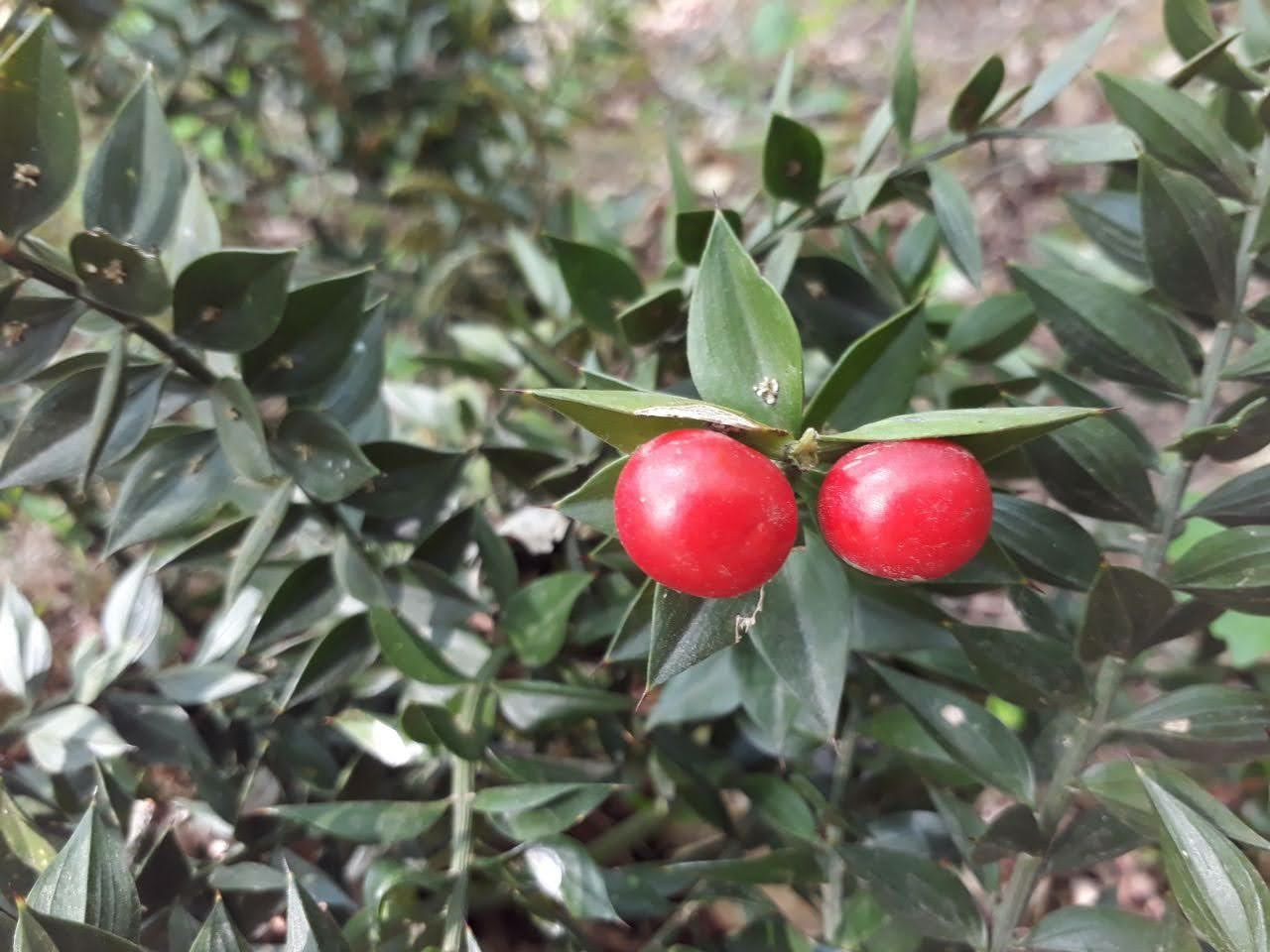
Fruit of R. hyrcanus

The flower is purplish or whitish, dioecious, marcescent with six spreading divisions, and solitary or geminate, arising in the axil of a lanceolate, firm bract on the median rib of the upper face of cladodes. Male flower has three stamens and sweating in a tube; female flower has an ovary with three biovulated lobes. The fruit is a red globular berry, about one centimeter in diameter. It is native to Iran, Georgia, Armenia, Azerbaijan and Crimea.

== Conservation ==
The species is of conservation concern in Azerbaijan, where it is listed in the Red Book of Azerbaijan. It is protected on lands such as Hirkan National Park.
