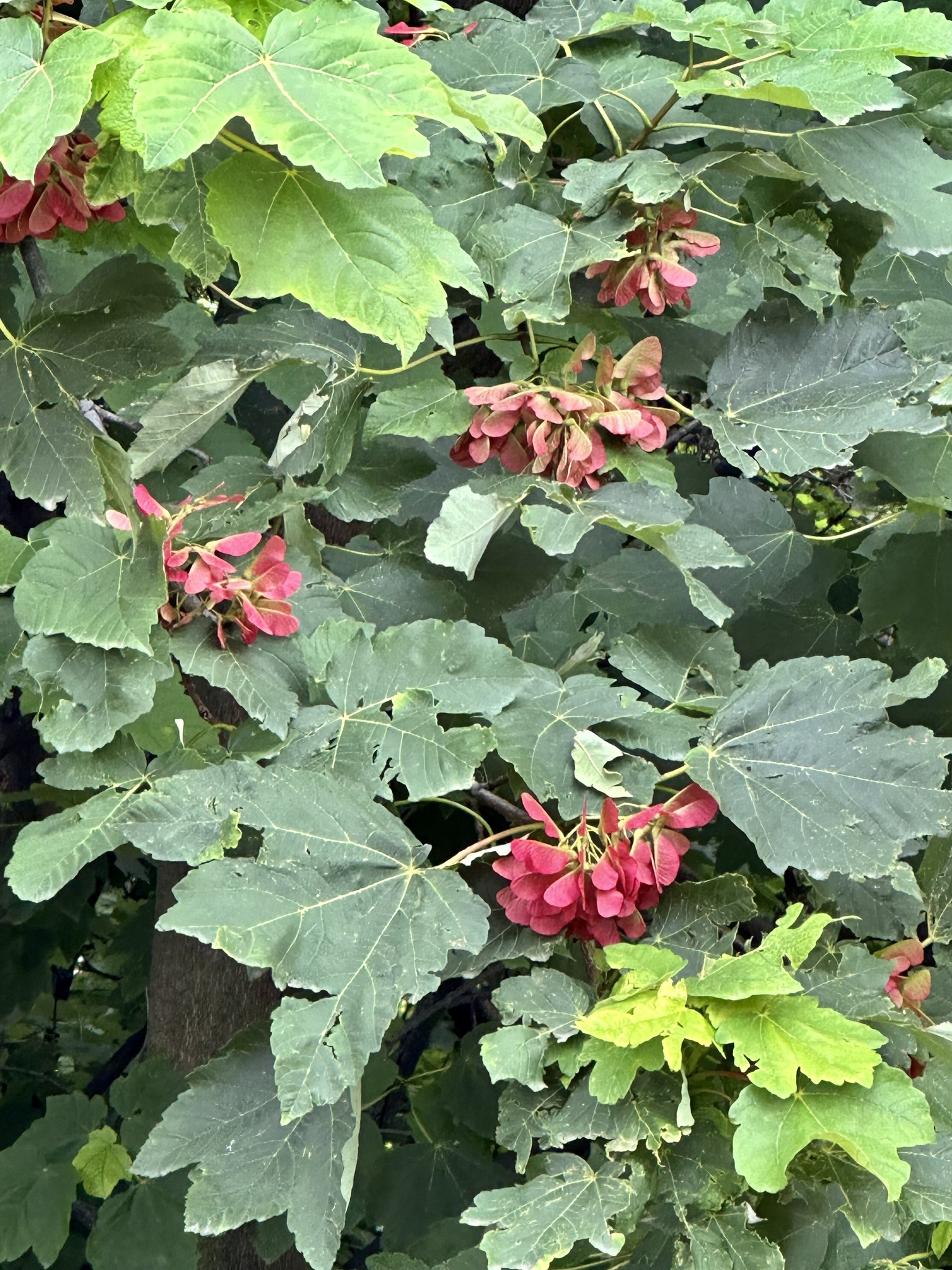
- Foliage and immature fruit, Georgia

Conservation status
- Least Concern (IUCN 3.1)

Scientific classification
- Kingdom: Plantae
- Clade: Tracheophytes
- Clade: Angiosperms
- Clade: Eudicots
- Clade: Rosids
- Order: Sapindales
- Family: Sapindaceae
- Genus: Acer
- Section: Acer sect. Acer
- Series: Acer ser. Acer
- Species: A. velutinum

Binomial name
- Acer velutinum Boiss. 1846 not Pax 1893

Synonyms
- List: Acer insigne Boiss. & Buhse; Acer insigne var. glabrescens Boiss. & Buhse; Acer insigne f. glabrescens (Boiss. & Buhse) Schwer.; Acer insigne var. longiloba Bornm.; Acer insigne var. obtusiloba Freyn & Sint.; Acer insigne f. perckense Schwer.; Acer insigne var. van-volxemii (Mast.) Pax; Acer insigne var. velutinum (Boiss.) Boiss. & Buhse; Acer insigne f. velutinum (Boiss.) Bornm.; Acer pseudoplatanus var. van-volxemii (Mast.) Wesm.; Acer pulchrum G.Nicholson; Acer van-volxemii Mast.

= Acer velutinum =

Species of plant in the soapberry family

Acer velutinum is a species of maple in the family Sapindaceae. It is referred to by the common names velvet maple or Persian maple, and is native to Azerbaijan, Georgia and northern Iran. It grows in the moist Caspian Hyrcanian mixed forests as wells as parts of Eastern Georgia.

It is a tall deciduous tree growing to over 40 m (130 ft) tall. Young trees have smooth grey bark, becoming scaly on older trees.

It is closely related to Acer pseudoplatanus, but differs in having the flowers in erect panicles, rather than pendulous racemes. The leaves are similar, but can be larger; the leaf blade is typically 10–15 cm long and 10–18 cm broad on mature trees, but on vigorous young trees can be 25 cm broad with a petiole to 27 cm long.

It is occasionally cultivated in parks in western Europe, most specimens under the name Acer velutinum var. van-volxemii, though this variety is no longer considered distinct from the species as a whole.
