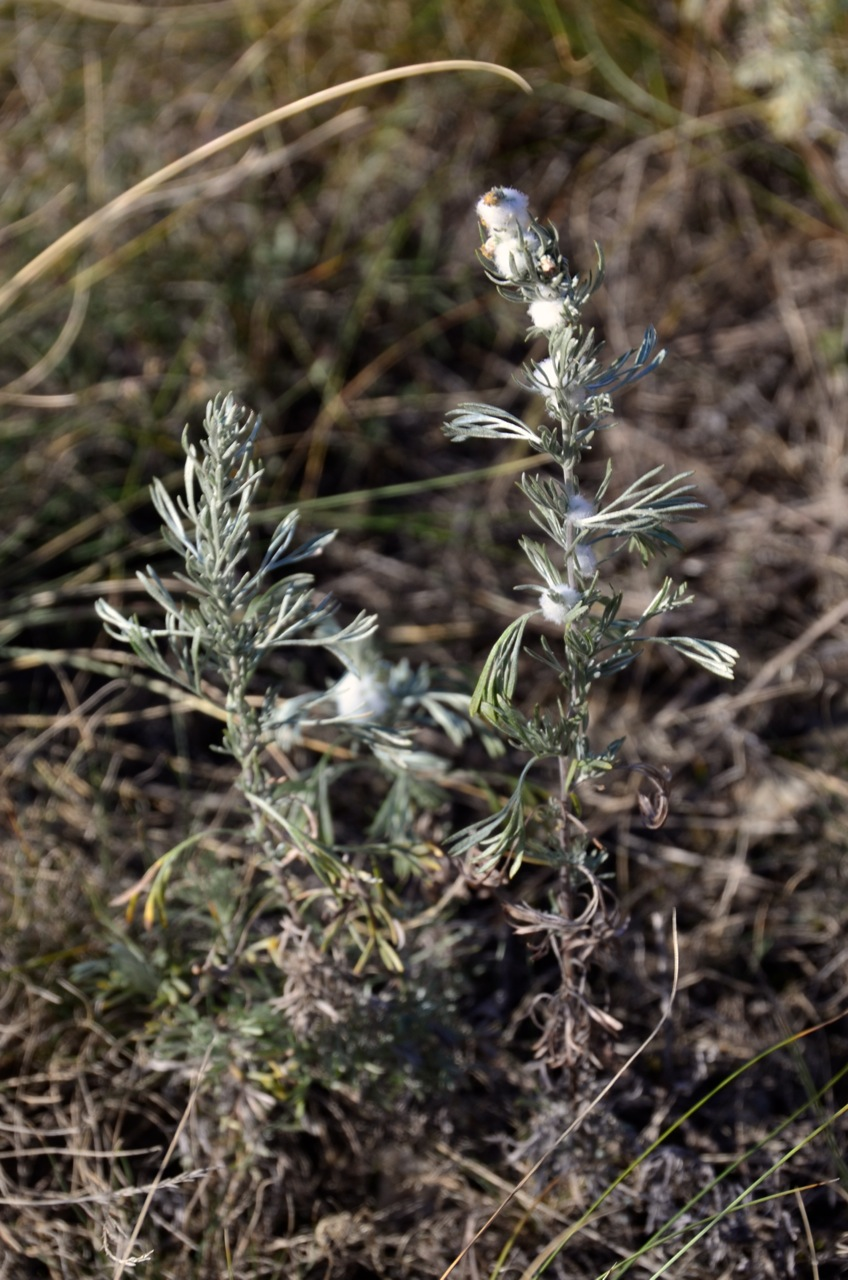

Scientific classification
- Kingdom: Plantae
- Clade: Tracheophytes
- Clade: Angiosperms
- Clade: Eudicots
- Clade: Asterids
- Order: Asterales
- Family: Asteraceae
- Genus: Artemisia
- Species: A. austriaca

Binomial name
- Artemisia austriaca L.

= Artemisia austriaca =

Species of flowering plant

Artemisia austriaca is a species of plant belonging to the family Asteraceae.

Its native range is Europe to Western Siberia, and Iran.
