= Golestan National Park =

National park of Iran

- IUCN category II (national park)
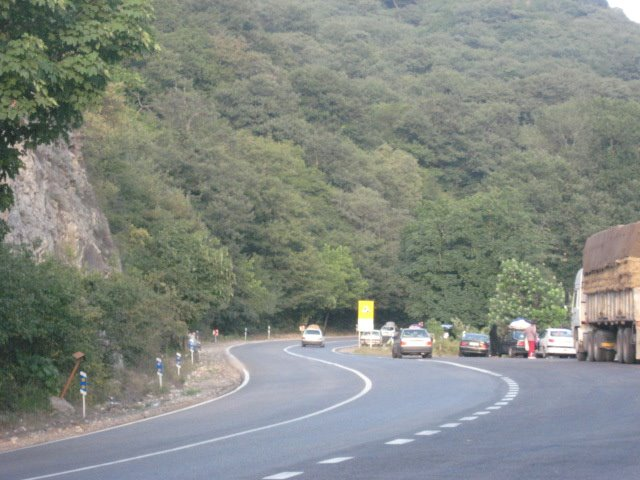

- Location within Iran
- Location: Iran
- Coordinates: 37.547527°N 56.382423°E
- Area: 918.9 km^{2} (354.8 sq mi)
- Governing body: Department of the Environment

UNESCO World Heritage Site
- Part of: Hyrcanian forests
- Criteria: Natural: ix
- Reference: 1584bis-001
- Inscription: 2019 (43rd Session)

Golestan National Park (Persian: پارک ملی گلستان) is a national park in northeastern Iran with an area of 918.95 km^{2} (354.81 sq mi) at elevations of 450 to 2,411 m (1,476 to 7,910 ft).

== Geography ==
Golestan National Park stretches over an area of 918.95 km^{2} (354.81 sq mi) in the easternmost part of the Hyrcanian forests in the Golestan, North Khorasan and Semnan provinces; its elevation ranges from 450 to 2,411 m (1,476 to 7,910 ft). It harbours deciduous forests, grasslands, shrublands and rocky areas.

== Wildlife ==
Mammal species in Golestan National Park include the leopard (Panthera pardus), Indian wolf (Canis lupus pallipes), brown bear (Ursus arctos), golden jackal (Canis aureus), wild boar (Sus scrofa), Caspian red deer (Cervus elaphus maral), roe deer (Capreolus capreolus), urial (Ovis orientalis arkal), wild goat (Capra aegagrus) and goitered gazelle (Gazella subgutturosa).

== See also ==
- Wildlife of Iran
