= Ilex hyrcana =

Ilex hyrcana Pojark., a botanical name published in 1947, is currently treated as a heterotypic synonym of Ilex spinigera (Loes.) Loes. by Plants of the World Online, following the World Checklist of Vascular Plants.

Ilex spinigera, the currently accepted name, was published in its present combination in 1919. It is an evergreen shrub or small tree in the holly family Aquifoliaceae, native from the Caucasus to northern Iran.

The species is known in English as the Persian holly or Iranian holly, and in Persian as Persian: خاس, romanized: khās.

It occurs in the Hyrcanian forests. A modern floristic study records the species from Gilan, Mazandaran and Golestan in Iran, as well as the Talysh region, at elevations from 30 to 2,018 metres. An official Iranian country report submitted to the Food and Agriculture Organization also lists Ilex spinigera among the tree and shrub species of Mazandaran Province.

== Description ==
Ilex hyrcana typically grows in the understory of broadleaf temperate forests across the Caspian basin. Characterized by glossy, spiny-toothed leaves and small berry-like fruits, it is adapted to humid sub-mediterranean microclimates and nutrient-rich forest soils. It plays a role in forest biodiversity and provides habitat and food for regional avian and insect species.

== Conservation ==
Due to habitat fragmentation, forest degradation, and land-use shifts in the Hyrcanian ecoregion, local populations of Ilex hyrcana face ecological pressures, making its monitoring important for biodiversity conservation in northern Iran.
