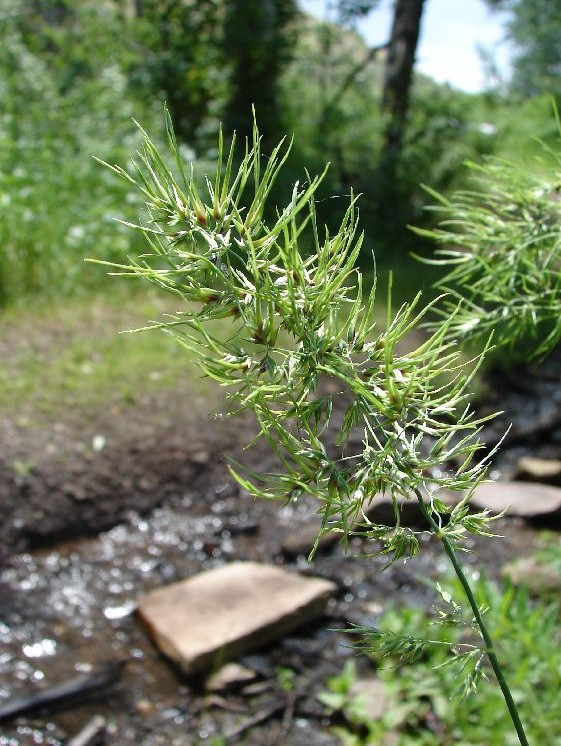

Scientific classification
- Kingdom: Plantae
- Clade: Tracheophytes
- Clade: Angiosperms
- Clade: Monocots
- Clade: Commelinids
- Order: Poales
- Family: Poaceae
- Subfamily: Pooideae
- Genus: Poa
- Species: P. bulbosa

Binomial name
- Poa bulbosa L.

= Poa bulbosa =

Species of grass

Poa bulbosa is a species of grass known by the common names bulbous bluegrass or bulbous meadow-grass. It is native to Eurasia and North Africa, but it is present practically worldwide as an introduced species. It is widespread in the United States and southern Canada. It was introduced to the eastern United States around 1906 and the western US in 1915 as a contaminant in shipments of alfalfa seed. It was intentionally planted on both the east and west coasts to control weeds and prevent erosion. Today it is a common grass across the continent and is a noxious weed in some areas. It is a sturdy, hardy, persistent, aggressive grass that easily outcompetes many other plants and becomes the dominant species in disturbed habitat types, such as overgrazed fields.

This is an annual or perennial grass forming dense clumps up to about 60 centimeters tall. The stems are smooth and hollow and usually have bulbous sections at their bases about a centimeter in length. The grass is more likely to have bulbous sections if it is growing in a drier area, and study has indicated the bulbous sections are mostly water. If the bulbous bases are detached and replanted they can give rise to new plants. The inflorescence is a wide cluster of branches bearing green leaflike spikelets with darker bases that contain bulbils. Viable seed is rarely produced, and the plant usually reproduces asexually via its basal bulbous sections and via bulbils. Although the plant reproduces vegetatively (asexually) most of the time, it has been shown to possess high genetic variability.

Many types of animals, including wild and domesticated ruminants, small mammals, and birds, readily consume this grass, especially the bulbils in the inflorescences, which contain some starches and fats. The grass is used as a fodder and a pasture grass in parts of its native region.
