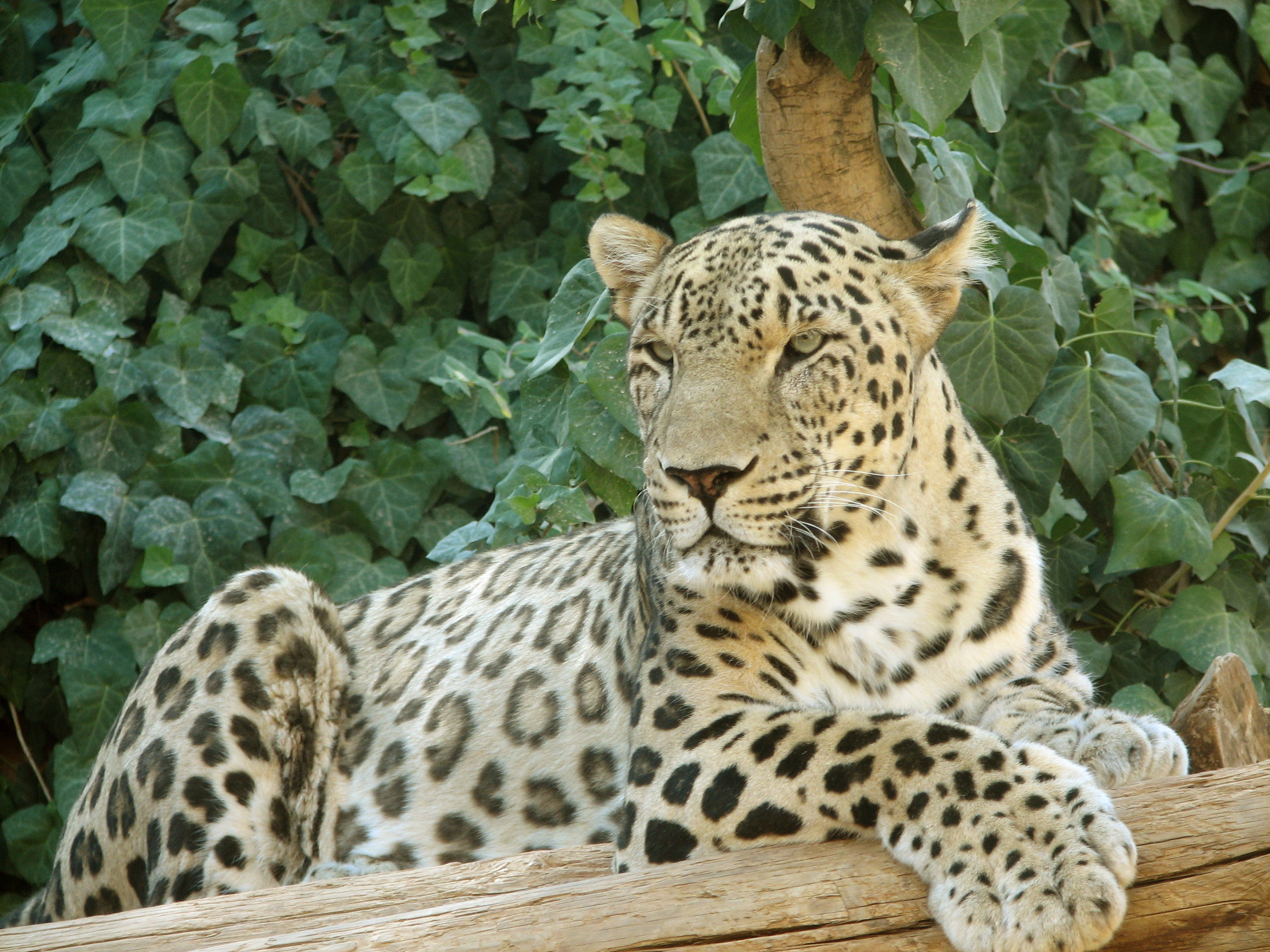

Conservation status
- Endangered (IUCN 3.1)

Scientific classification
- Kingdom: Animalia
- Phylum: Chordata
- Class: Mammalia
- Order: Carnivora
- Family: Felidae
- Genus: Panthera
- Species: P. pardus
- Subspecies: P. p. tulliana

Trinomial name
- Panthera pardus tulliana (Valenciennes, 1856)
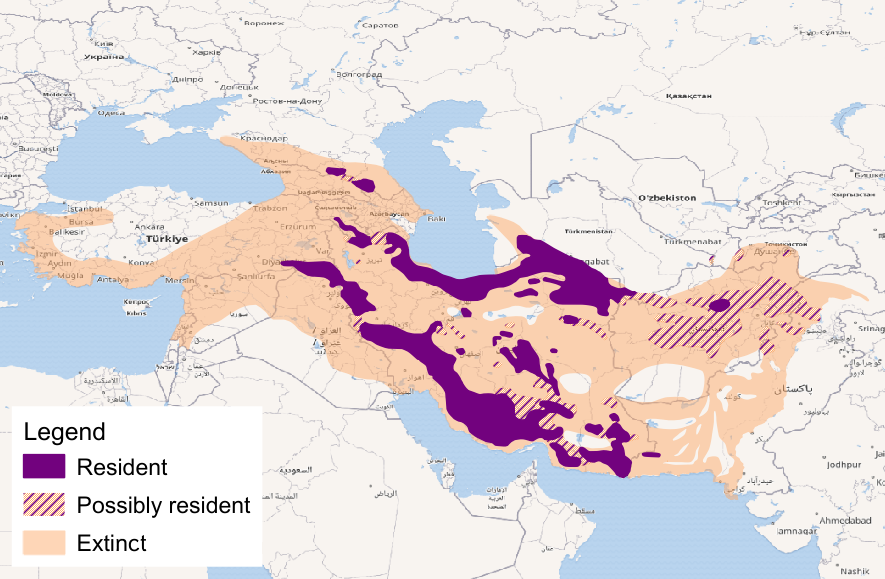
- Distribution of P. p. tulliana, 2016

Synonyms
- P. p. ciscaucasica (Satunin, 1914); P. p. saxicolor Pocock, 1927; P. p. sindica Pocock, 1930; P. p. dathei Zukowsky, 1964

= Panthera pardus tulliana =

Leopard subspecies

Panthera pardus tulliana, also called the Persian leopard, Anatolian leopard and Caucasian leopard in different parts of its range, is a leopard subspecies native to the Iranian Plateau and the surrounding region from eastern Anatolia and the Caucasus to the Hindu Kush. First described in 1856 based on a zoological specimen from western Anatolia, the leopard primarily inhabits subalpine meadows, temperate broadleaf and mixed forests and rugged ravines at elevations of 600 to 3,800 m (2,000 to 12,500 ft). It preys mostly on ungulates reliant on these habitats.

Today, the subspecies' population is estimated at fewer than 1,100 adults. It is threatened by habitat fragmentation due to land use changes, poaching, loss of wild prey species, and killing in retaliation for preying on livestock. It is internationally protected under CITES Appendix I and is listed in Appendix II of the Berne Convention on the Conservation of European Wildlife and Natural Habitats.

== Taxonomy ==
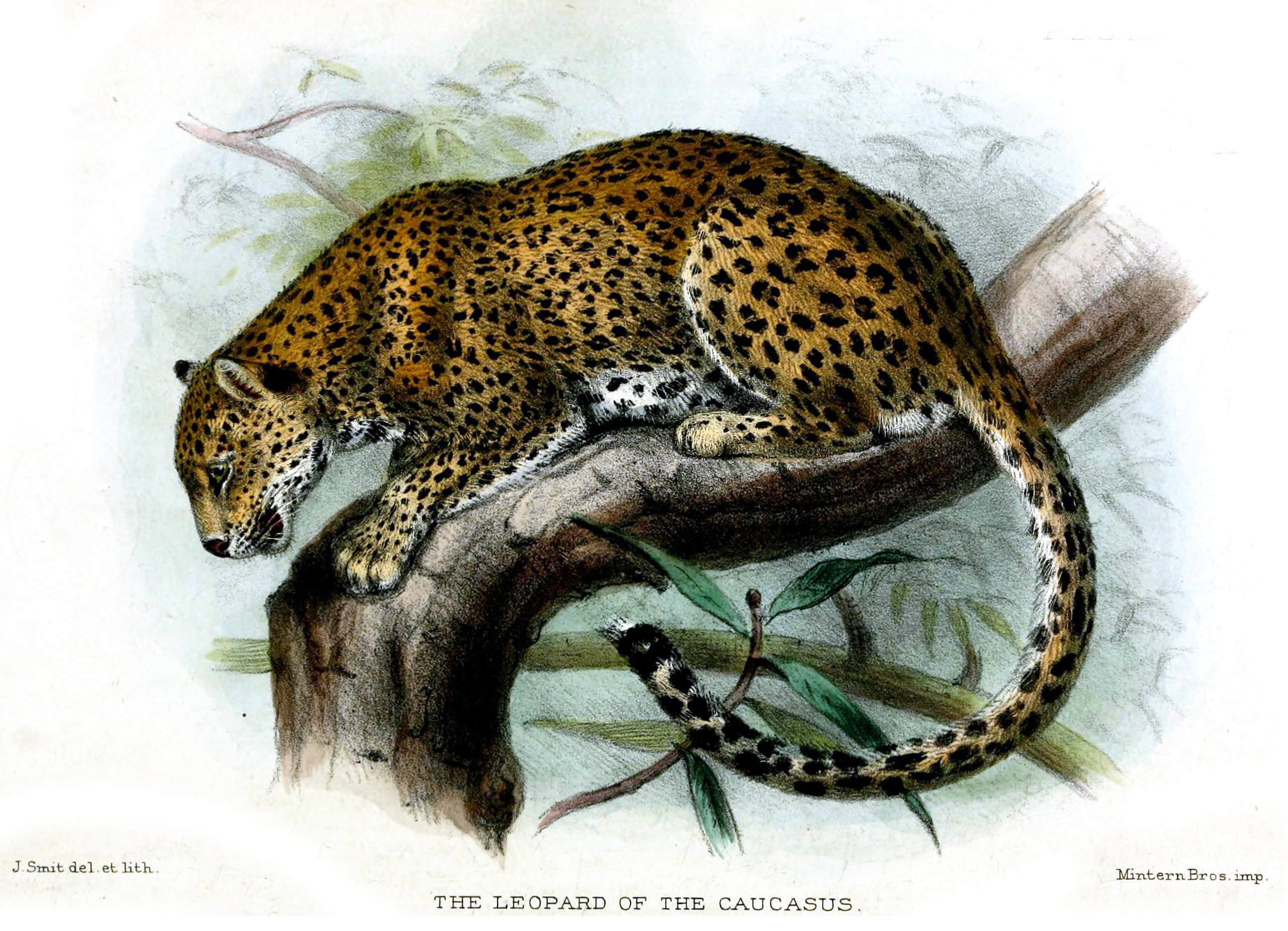
The Leopard of the Caucasus, illustration by Joseph Smit, 1899

Felis tulliana was the scientific name proposed by Achille Valenciennes in 1856, who described a skin and skull from a leopard killed near Smyrna, in western Anatolia. In the 19th and 20th centuries, several naturalists described leopard zoological specimens from the Middle East:

- Felis pardus tulliana was proposed by Richard Lydekker in 1899 after examining a leopard skin from the Caucasus.
- Felis ciscaucasica was proposed by Konstantin Alekseevich Satunin in 1914, based on a leopard specimen from the Kuban region in the North Caucasus.
- Panthera pardus saxicolor was proposed by Reginald Innes Pocock in 1927, based on leopard skins from different areas of Persia, which Pocock recognized as similar to Caucasian leopard skins. His holotype was a skin and a skull of a male leopard from Asterabad.
- Panthera pardus sindica was proposed by Pocock in 1930 for a single skin and two skulls from the Kirthar Mountains in Balochistan; the skin closely resembled Persian leopard and Asia Minor leopard skins, but its colour differed from the colour of the Indian leopard (P. p. fusca). It was subsumed to P. p. saxicolor based on molecular genetic analysis in 1996.

In the 19th and 20th centuries, the Anatolian leopard was considered a distinct leopard subspecies that occurred only in western Turkey. The leopard specimens available in zoological museum collections do not differ significantly in the sizes and shapes of skulls. Therefore, the subspecific names tulliana, ciscaucasica and saxicolor are currently considered synonyms.

The Indus River is thought to form a topographical barrier to the dispersal of this subspecies. An analysis of leopard samples from Afghanistan revealed that they were of P. p. saxicolor, but intergraded with the Indian leopard. A genetic analysis of 49 leopard skin samples collected in the Azad Jammu Kashmir and Galyat regions of northern Pakistan corroborated this intergradation; these samples revealed haplotypes of both Persian and Indian leopards.

In 2017, the Persian leopard population was subsumed under P. p. tulliana, which is the oldest available name for the leopard subspecies in West Asia.

=== Phylogeny ===
A phylogenetic analysis indicates that P. p. tulliana matrilineally belongs to a monophyletic group that diverged from the African leopard (P. p. pardus) and the Arabian leopard (P. p. nimr) in the second half of the Pleistocene. DNA analysis indicates that the leopards in Iran belong to a single gene pool and form a distinct subclade.

== Characteristics ==
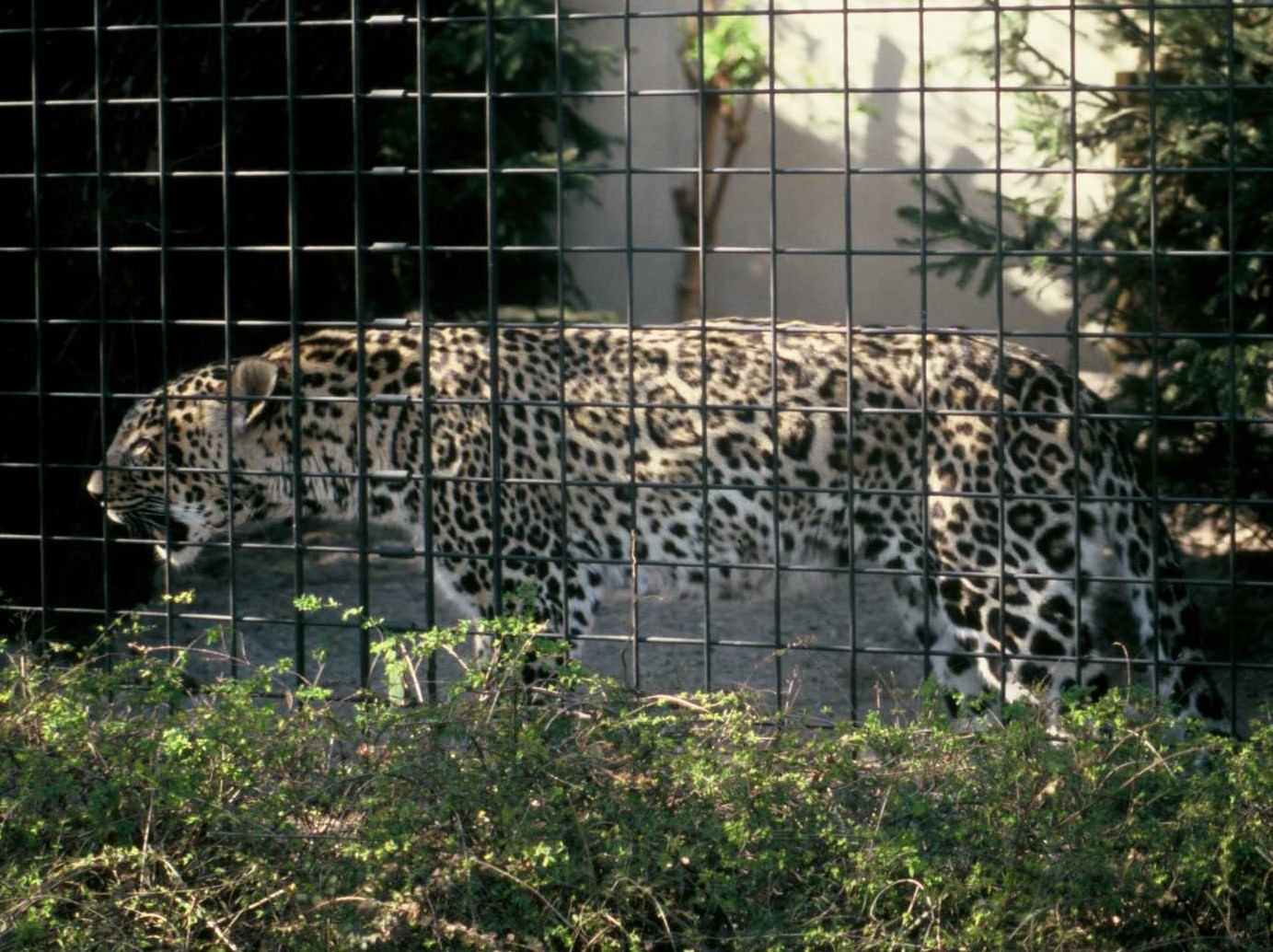
Leopard with unusual coat pattern

P. p. tulliana has grayish, slightly reddish fur with large rosettes on the flanks and back, smaller ones on the shoulder and upper legs, and spots on the head and neck. It varies in colouration; in Iran both pale and dark individuals occur. Its average body length is 158 cm (62 in), with a 192 mm (7.6 in) long skull and a 94 cm (37 in) long tail. It weighs up to 60 kg (130 lb). A skull and skin of an adult male leopard collected in 1945 measured 125 cm (49 in) in body length with a dry tail length of 105 cm (41 in). Its skull exhibited a condylobasal length of 207.4 mm (8.17 in) and a zygomatic width of 135.2 mm (5.32 in), and its upper tooth row $C-M^1$ measured 78.2 mm (3.08 in), which was slightly larger than any other regional Caucasian leopard specimen measured in their comparative series.

Biometric data collected from 25 female and male individuals in various provinces of Iran indicate an average body length of 259 cm (102 in). A young male from northern Iran weighed 64 kg (141 lb).

== Distribution and habitat ==
The habitat of P. p. tulliana in the Greater Caucasus is subalpine meadows, temperate broadleaf and mixed forests and rugged ravines from 600 to 3,800 m (2,000 to 12,500 ft). In the Lesser Caucasus and Iran, it inhabits rocky slopes, mountain steppes and sparse juniper forests.

Population of P. p. tulliana
Country	Year	Estimate
Iran	2022	550–850
Pakistan	2022	130–178
Turkmenistan	2022	60–80
Azerbaijan	2022	8–19
Iraq	2022	9
Armenia	2022	3–9
Russia	2022	6
Georgia	2022	1
Kazakhstan	2022	0–5
Turkey	2021	fewer than 5
Afghanistan	2022	unknown
Total	2022	750–1,044

In northern Anatolia, zoologists found evidence of leopards in the upper forest and alpine zones of the Pontic Mountains during surveys carried out between 1993 and 2002, though its presence in the Pontic Mountains was questioned in 2016 due to a lack of evidence. The leopard's preferred habitat is thought to be sparse forest areas, followed by rocky areas, agriculture and pasture areas, and riparian zones. In southeastern Turkey, its presence was documented in the Çınar district of Diyarbakır Province and in Bitlis Province. In 2018 and 2019, it was photographed on the northern slopes of Mount Cudi in Şırnak Province, which may be a corridor for movement between Turkey and Iraq. The leopard has also been photographed in the north-eastern province of Artvin, which borders Georgia, but whether the animals are resident in the area is not known.

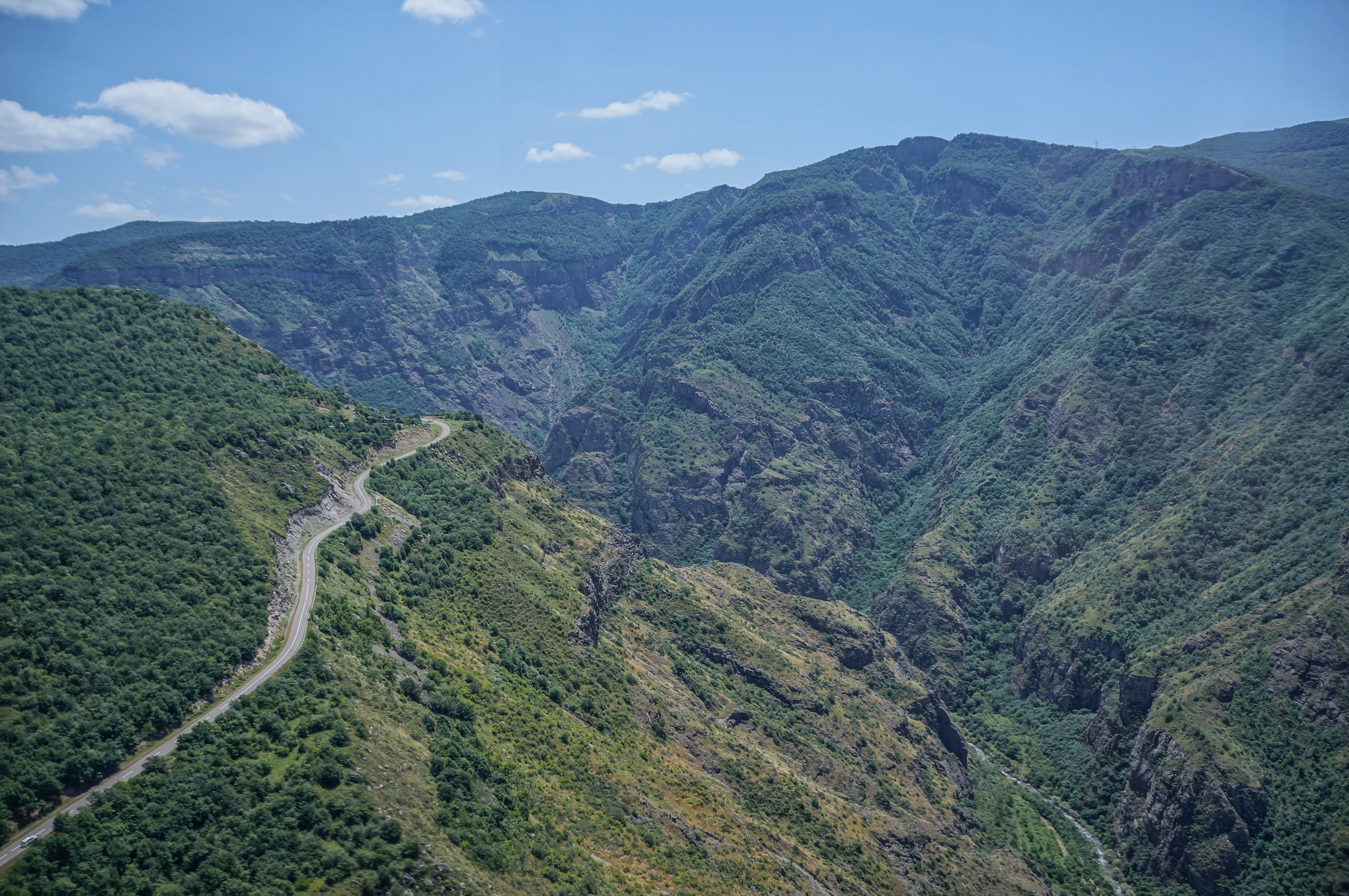
Habitat in Zangezur Mountains

In the Caucasus, leopards were sighted around the Tbilisi area and in Shida Kartli province in Georgia, where they live primarily in dense forests. Several individuals were sighted in the lowland plains of the Kakheti region in 2004. Leopard signs were also found at two localities in Tusheti, the headwaters of the Andi Koysu and Assa Rivers bordering Dagestan. Leopards are thought to occasionally move through Georgia from Russia, but naturalists hope they might become resident in Georgia in the future if well protected in both countries. During surveys in 2013 – 2014, camera traps recorded leopards in 24 locations in southern Armenia, of which 14 were in the Zangezur Mountains. This trans-boundary mountain range provides an important breeding habitat for leopards in the Lesser Caucasus. In March 2007 and October 2012 an individual was photographed by a camera trap in Hirkan National Park, and surveys in 2013-2014 recorded leopards in five locations within the park. This protected area in southeastern Azerbaijan is in the Talysh Mountains, which are contiguous with the Alborz Mountains in Iran. The first male leopard crossing from Hirkan National Park into Iran was documented in February 2014, though it was killed in the Chubar Highlands in northwestern Iran's Gilan province by a local hunter. The incident suggests that the Talysh Mountains are an important corridor for trans-boundary movement of leopards.

Multiple leopards have been recorded in areas close to the Armenia-Azerbaijan border in Zangezur National Park, including females with cubs. Leopards have been sporadically recorded in northern Iraq. In October 2011 and January 2012, a leopard was photographed by a camera trap on Jazhna Mountain in the Zagros Mountains forest steppe in the Kurdistan Region, and between 2001 and 2014, at least nine leopards were killed by local people in this region.

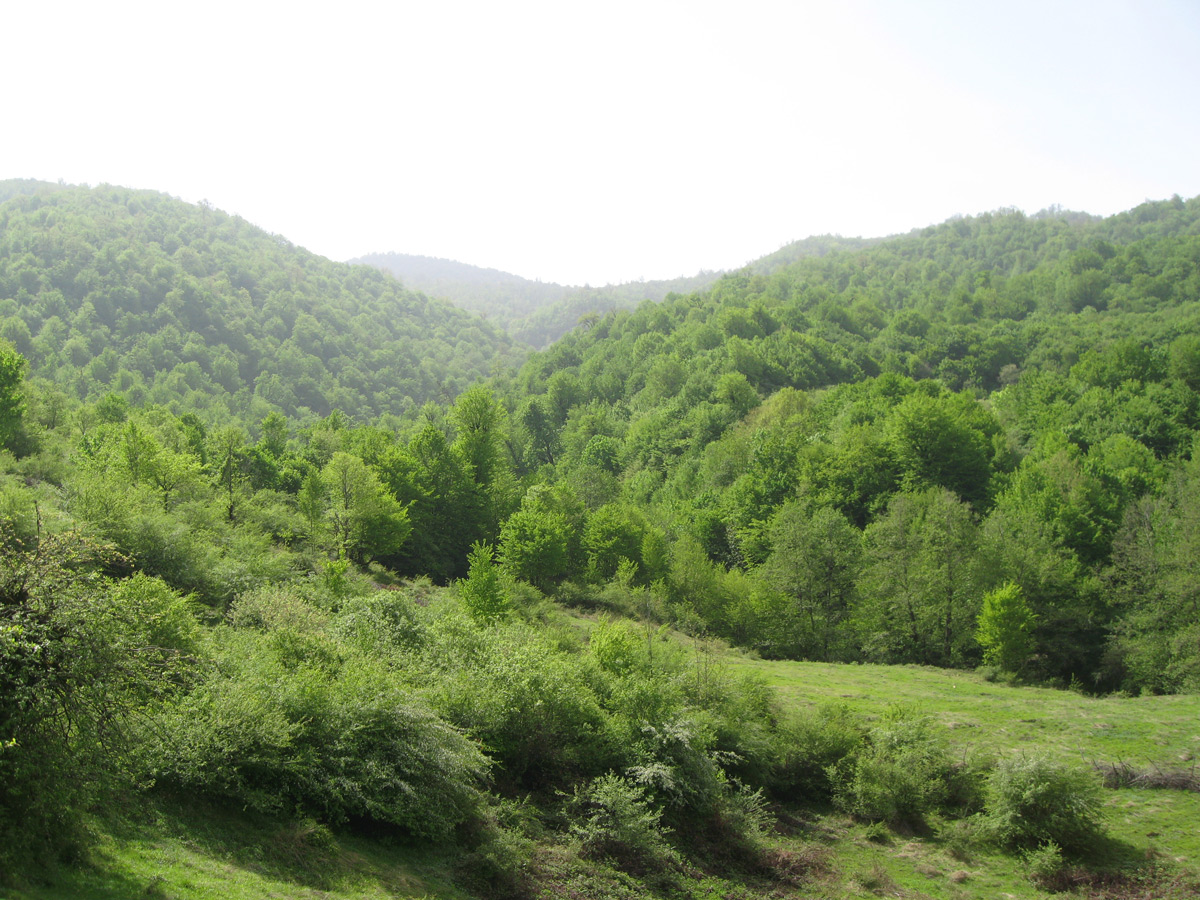
Valley in Alborz Mountains

Iran is a stronghold of the leopard in the region. The subspecies is more abundant in the northern than in the southern part of the country, and in the 2010s was recorded in 74 of 204 protected areas. The Caspian Hyrcanian mixed forests along the Alborz Mountains are one of the most important habitats for the leopard in the country. Most leopards were recorded in habitats with temperatures of 13 to 18 °C (55 to 64 °F), a maximum of 20 days of ice cover per year, and an annual rainfall of more than 200 mm (7.9 in). The Central Alborz Protected Area, which covers more than 3,500 km^{2} (1,400 sq mi), is one of the largest reserves in the country in which leopards roam. Evidence for leopard reproduction was documented in six localities inside protected areas in the Iranian part of the Lesser Caucasus. Surveys between 2005 and 2008, and in summer 2016, documented the presence of leopards in Sarigol National Park, Salouk National Park, and Tandooreh National Park. These included 10 cubs in seven families, highlighting that the Kopet Dag and Aladagh Mountains are important leopard refugia in the region. Between September 2014 and August 2016, two radio-collared leopards moved from Iran's Kopet Dag region into Turkmenistan, revealing that the leopard population in the two countries is connected. In 2017, a young male leopard from Iran's Tandooreh National Park dispersed to and settled in Turkmenistan, and an elderly male Persian leopard was found to have moved 20 km (12 mi) from Iran to Turkmenistan in 2018.

In Pakistan, leopards inhabit Himalayan forests and montane regions; leopards have been recorded in and around Machiara National Park, Pir Lasora National Park, and Ayubia National Park.

In Kazakhstan, a leopard was recorded for the first time in 2000 in the Jambyl Region. In 2007 and 2015, two leopards were killed in the Mangystau Region farther west in the country. Between September and December 2018, camera traps recorded a leopard on a cliff in Ustyurt Nature Reserve.

=== Historical range ===
P. p. tulliana was most likely distributed over the entire Caucasus, except for the steppe areas. The northern foothills of the Greater Caucasus formed the northern boundary of its historic range. During surveys conducted between 2001 and 2005, no leopard was recorded in the western Greater Caucasus; it probably survived only at a few sites in the eastern part. In Armenia, people and leopards have co-existed since prehistoric times and in the mid-20th century the leopard was relatively common in the country's mountains.

Stone traps for leopards and other predators dating to the Roman Empire still exist in the Taurus Mountains in southern Turkey. The last leopard in Syria is reported to have been killed in 1963 in the Syrian Coastal Mountain Range. P. p. tulliana was once numerous in the Aegean Region between İzmir and Antalya, with the Beşparmak Mountains considered a stronghold. Several factors contributed to the decline of the leopard population in this region between the late 1940s and mid 1970s, including deforestation, conversion of natural habitat to orchards, road construction, and killing of leopards in retaliation for livestock predation. Since surveys were not carried out in western Turkey until the mid-1980s, biologists doubted whether leopards still survived in the region. Sighting reports from the environs of Alanya in the south of the Lycian peninsula suggested that a scattered population existed between Finike, Antalya and Alanya in the early 1990s. Fresh faecal pellets found in Mount Güllük-Termessos National Park in 1992 were attributed to an Anatolian leopard, but surveys in western Turkey between 2000 and 2004 found no contemporary evidence of leopards. Extensive trophy hunting is thought to be the prime factor for the decline of the Anatolian leopard in this area. It is considered locally extinct in western Turkey since the mid-1970s. No signs of the presence of leopards were detected in Termessos National Park during surveys in 2005, and local people and national park personnel were not aware of any.

The leopard population in southern Russia had been reduced to two small and isolated populations by the 1950s, and by 2007, there were fewer than 50 individuals in the region. Since 1954, leopards were thought to be extirpated in Georgia, following killing by hunters. The political and social changes caused by the breakup of the Soviet Union in 1992 caused a severe economic crisis and weakening of formerly effective protection systems; wildlife habitats were severely fragmented, leopards were persecuted and wild ungulates were hunted. In addition, inadequate baseline data and lack of monitoring programmes made it difficult to evaluate declines of mammalian prey species. In the winter of 2003, zoologists found footprints of a leopard in Vashlovani National Park in southeastern Georgia. Camera traps recorded one young male individual several times. The individual was not recorded again between 2009 and 2014, and a survey in 2019 found no leopards.

Leopards also survived in northwestern Azerbaijan in the Akhar-Bakhar section of the Ilisu State Reserve in the foothills of the Greater Caucasus, but in 2007 numbers were thought to be extremely low. In November 1945, an adult male leopard was found trapped inside a dry, 5 m (16 ft) deep vertical limestone well near Bilgəh on the Absheron Peninsula, roughly 25 km (16 mi) east of Baku. It had likely moved along the rugged, forested corridors of the Greater Caucasus mountains to reach the peninsula and had fallen into the well during a blizzard ten days prior. It was killed by local people. This remains the only documented occurrence of a leopard on the Absheron Peninsula, and the complete skeleton and mounted specimen were deposited in the Hasanbey Zardabi Natural History Museum.

In Afghanistan, the leopard is thought to inhabit the central highlands of the Hindu Kush and the Wakhan corridor,, but none have been photographed. The long-lasting conflict in the country badly affected both predator and prey species, so the national population is considered to be small and severely threatened. In the 1970s, the leopard's presence was recorded in Pakistan's Kirthar Mountains, northeastern Baluchistan and Murree Hills.

== Behaviour and ecology ==
The diet of P. p. tulliana varies depending on habitat. In southern Armenia and Iran, it preys mostly on wild goat (Capra aegagrus), mouflon (Ovis gmelini), wild boar (Sus scrofa), roe deer (Capreolus capreolus), goitered gazelle (Gazella subgutturosa), Indian crested porcupine (Hystrix indica), and European hare (Lepus europaeus). It occasionally attacks livestock and herding dogs. In Iran, the presence of leopards is highly correlated with the presence of wild goat and wild sheep. An attack by a leopard on an onager (Equus hemionus) was also recorded. In Turkey, it also preys on chamois (Rupicapra rupicapra).

Adult males usually share their home ranges entirely or partially with two or three adult females. The mating season lasts from mid-January to mid-February. In Sarigol National Park, three females were documented in late April to May 2008 with one to two cubs each. A female with two cubs was also photographed in the Alborz Mountains.

== Threats ==
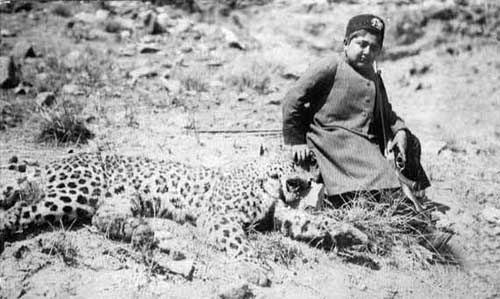
Ahmad Shah Qajar after a leopard hunt, around 1905–1910

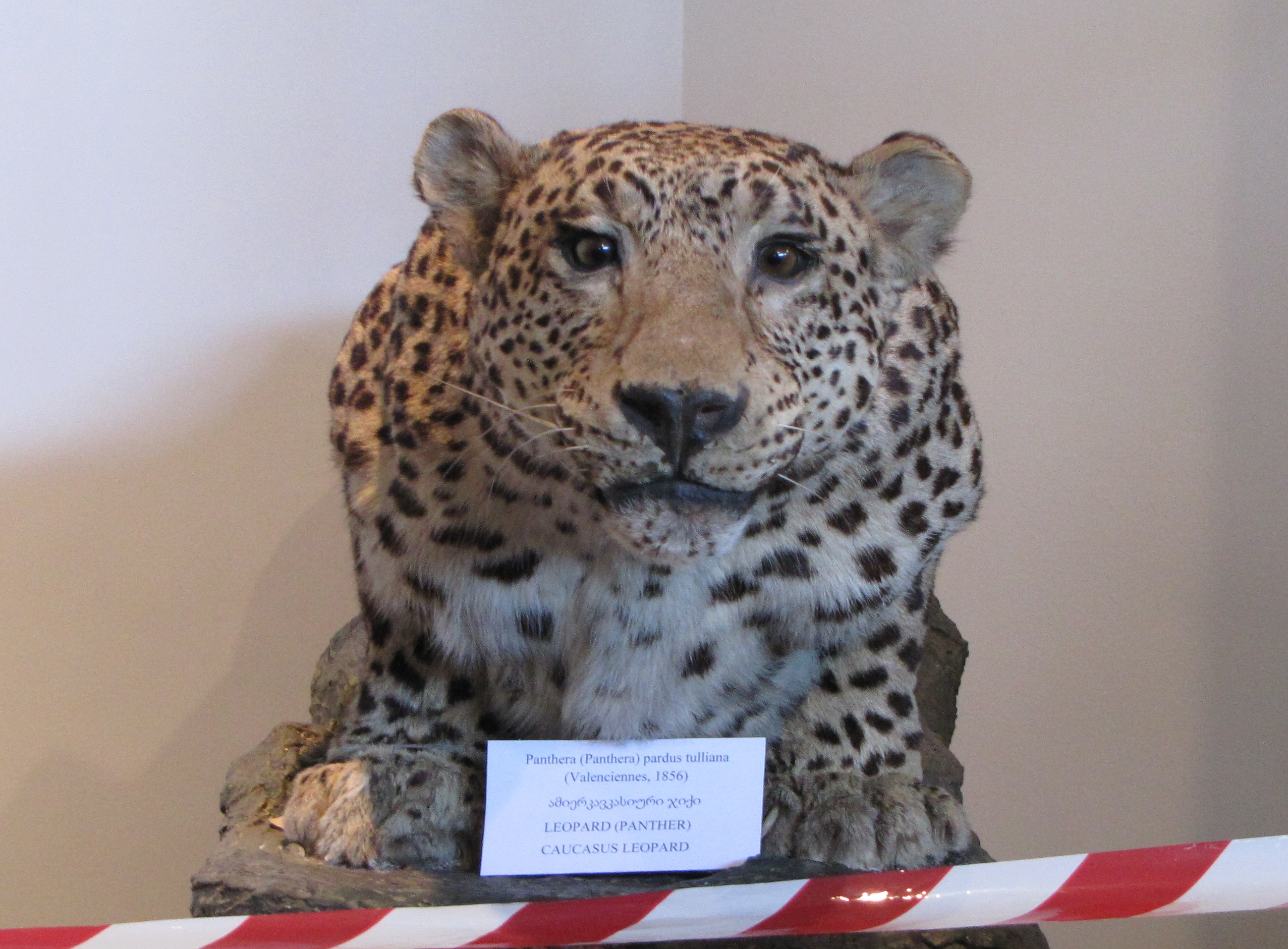
A stuffed leopard in the Georgian National Museum, Tbilisi

Since 2016, P. p. tulliana has been listed as Endangered on the IUCN Red List, as the wild population is estimated at less than 1,000 mature individuals. The subspecies is threatened by poaching, depletion of the prey base due to poaching, human disturbance such as presence of military and training of troops in border areas, and habitat loss due to deforestation, fire, agricultural expansion, overgrazing, and infrastructure development. In the 1980s, anti-personnel mines were deployed along the northern part of the Iran-Iraq border to deter people from entering the area. Leopards roaming the area are safe from poachers and industrial development, but at least two individuals are known to have stepped on mines and been killed. The main threat in northern Iraq is deforestation, which in the early 2020s is being worsened by an economic crisis.

In April 2001, an adult female was shot on the border to Kabardino-Balkaria; her two cubs were captured and taken to Novosibirsk Zoo in Russia. Between 2004 and 2007, a total of 85 leopard skins were seen being offered in markets in Kabul. Leopards were known to live on the Meghri Ridge in the extreme south of Armenia, where only one individual was imaged by a camera trap between August 2006 and April 2007, but no signs of other leopards were found during track surveys conducted over an area of 296.9 km^{2} (114.6 sq mi). The local prey base could support 4 – 10 individuals. But the combined impact of poaching, disturbance caused by livestock breeding, gathering of edible plants and mushrooms, deforestation, and human-induced wildfires was so high that the tolerance limits of leopards were exceeded. Only some small and isolated populations remain in the whole Caucasus. Suitable habitat is limited and most often situated in remote border areas. Local populations depend on immigration from source populations mainly in Iran.

In Turkey, the leopard has been killed illegally in traps and through poison. Several leopards are known to have been killed since 1974 in Beypazarı, Siirt Province, Diyarbakır Province and Tunceli Provinces. Despite ongoing efforts to reforest Turkey, the country lacks a plan to reconnect fragmented forests as of 2020, which may further fragment leopard populations in the region.

In Iran, the primary threats are habitat disturbances, poaching, and an excess of livestock in leopard habitats. Leopards are unlikely to persist outside of protected areas. Droughts in wide areas of leopard habitats affected the main prey species such as wild goat and wild sheep, leading to a decline in leopard populations. An assessment of leopard mortality in Iran revealed that 71 leopards were killed between 2007 and 2011 in 18 provinces; 70% were hunted or poisoned illegally, and 18% died in road accidents. Between 2000 and 2015, 147 leopards were killed in the country. More than 60% of them died due to poaching, through poisonous bait, and were shot by rangers, trophy hunters, and the military. About 26% of them died in road accidents. More males than females were killed. Between 2007 and spring 2021, 78 leopards died in Iran because of humans; 62 were shot or poisoned by herders or killed by their dogs. Retaliatory killings of leopards occur after attacks on livestock. Leopards injured 30 people and killed one in the country between 2012 and 2020, mostly thought to be defensive reactions by animals surprised by livestock herders.

== Conservation ==
The leopard is listed in CITES Appendix I and as strictly protected in Appendix II of the Berne Convention on the Conservation of European Wildlife and Natural Habitats. In Azerbaijan, the leopard has been protected by law since 1969; in Armenia and in the Soviet Union, it was protected by law in 1972. The leopard population of the Caucasus was listed in Russia's Red Data Book under Category I as threatened with extinction. It has been protected by law in Iran since 1999. In 2001, hunting leopards was banned in Nakhchivan Autonomous Republic, and anti-poaching activities were regularly conducted in southern Armenia since 2003. Since 2005, seven protected areas have been established in the Lesser Caucasus covering an area of 1,940 km^{2} (750 sq mi), in addition to three in the Talysh Mountains with a combined area of 449 km^{2} (173 sq mi). The total protected area in the country now amounts to 4,245 km^{2} (1,639 sq mi). In Georgia's national Red Data Book, the leopard has been listed as Critically Endangered since 2006. Penalties for killing leopards have been adopted and increased several times in Armenia and Azerbaijan since 2006 and 2000, respectively. In Afghanistan, the leopard was included in the country's Protected Species List in 2009, and Kazakhstan made hunting it a criminal offence in 2021. In Turkey, the leopard is one of the species listed in the action plan being prepared for the country's endangered species.

In 2001, a five-year leopard conservation project was initiated in the Caucasus, which supported systematic surveys in the region, the planning of new and enlargement of existing protected areas, training of border guards, and school education campaigns in Armenia and Azerbaijan; an anti-poaching unit was set up in Armenia. In 2005, the Armenian Ministry of Environment approved a conservation plan with the leopard as an umbrella species, and a strategy for leopard conservation in the Caucasus in 2008. In Iran, a leopard conservation and management action plan was endorsed in 2016, supported by Future4Leopards Foundation, a non-profit conservation organization operating in the country. As of 2019, Nature Iraq is mapping potential habitat near the border with Iran as the first stage of a conservation project. Conservationists hope that this work will encourage people to protect, connect and restore suitable habitat, including international Wildlife corridors. Wildlife corridors for the safe dispersal of leopards between the Iraq-Iran border and other protected areas in Iran's Alborz Mountains have been mapped in an area of 3,132 km^{2} (1,209 sq mi). Three core habitats and suitable corridors between protected areas in the Zagros Mountains were identified along the international border between Iran and Iraq.As of 2022, further conservation work is needed to conserve corridors, including protecting more areas.

In 2021, several authors suggested that there is enough suitable habitat in the Caucasus as a whole for over 1,000 leopards, but a metapopulation will only be viable if persecution is reduced and prey is restored.

=== Reintroduction projects ===
In 2009, the Leopard Breeding and Rehabilitation Centre in Russia's Sochi National Park received two leopards from Turkmenistan as part of a leopard breeding and reintroduction programme. Since then, leopards have been brought from various zoos. Their offspring were released into the wild in 2016 and 2018, including three males and one female into the Caucasus Biosphere Reserve, and one male and one female into Alaniya National Park in North Ossetia – Alania.

=== In captivity ===
As of 2021, there are over 100 captive Persian leopards in zoos worldwide, and the European Endangered Species Programme has a captive breeding program to sustain a backup population.

== In history and culture ==
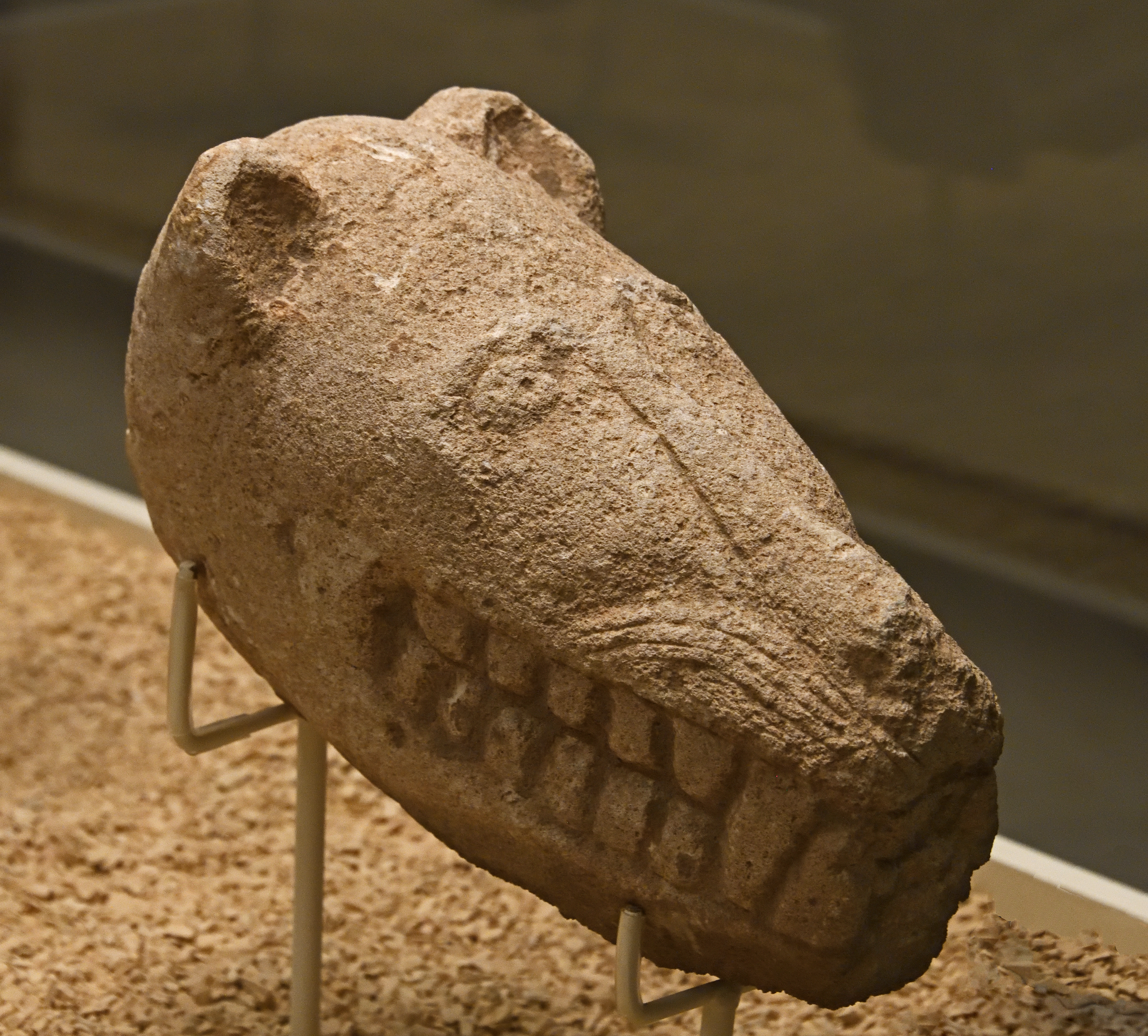
Artifact found at Göbekli Tepe, possibly a representation of P. p. tulliana.

Representations of the Anatolian leopard dating from the Neolithic period to the end of the 6th century BC were found in the ancient city of Thyatira in Anatolia. The leopard is depicted in statues, pottery, ivory works, and coins associated with the Lydian culture. Several pieces were found in areas that were used for worship. Leopard skin patterns were also used on Anatolian carpets and kaftans.

When Roman statesman Marcus Tullius Cicero was serving as Governor of Cilicia in 50 BC, he asked for leopards to be sent from Kibyratis in Anatolia, which were used for gladiators to fight; hence the scientific name from his middle name. These leopards were requested by his former mentee Marcus Caelius Rufus, who was serving as curule aedile in Rome at the time and therefore in charge of organising the games. Caelius sent multiple letters requesting panthers, but Cicero jokingly claimed that the animals had left the area for Caria due to overhunting.

The Natural History Museum of the Aegean on Samos Island in Greece exhibits a stuffed animal said to have been killed on the island in 1862, labelled Kaplani (Greek: Καπλάνι), meaning leopard. Its size, shape and coat colour are rather unnatural for a leopard, but may have been altered in the process of taxidermy. It is possible that a leopard reached the island by swimming across the 1.7 km (1.1 mi) wide channel from the Turkish coast. One more leopard had reached Samos in 1836 and was trapped. The story of the leopard and the exhibit inspired Greek author Alki Zei to write a novel for children titled Το καπλάνι της βιτρίνας, translated as Wildcat Under Glass.

== See also ==
- Amur leopard
- African leopard
- Arabian leopard
- Chinese leopard
- Indochinese leopard
- Javan leopard
- Panthera pardus spelaea
- Sri Lankan leopard
- Zanzibar leopard
