= Asiatic leopard =

The names Asiatic leopard and Asian leopard refer to any of the following leopard (Panthera pardus) subspecies in Asia:

- Amur leopard (P. p. orientalis)
- Anatolian or Persian leopard (P. p. tulliana)
- Arabian leopard (P. p. nimr)
- Indian leopard (P. p. fusca)
- Indochinese leopard (P. p. delacouri)
- Javan leopard (P. p. melas)
- Sri Lankan leopard (P. p. kotiya)
