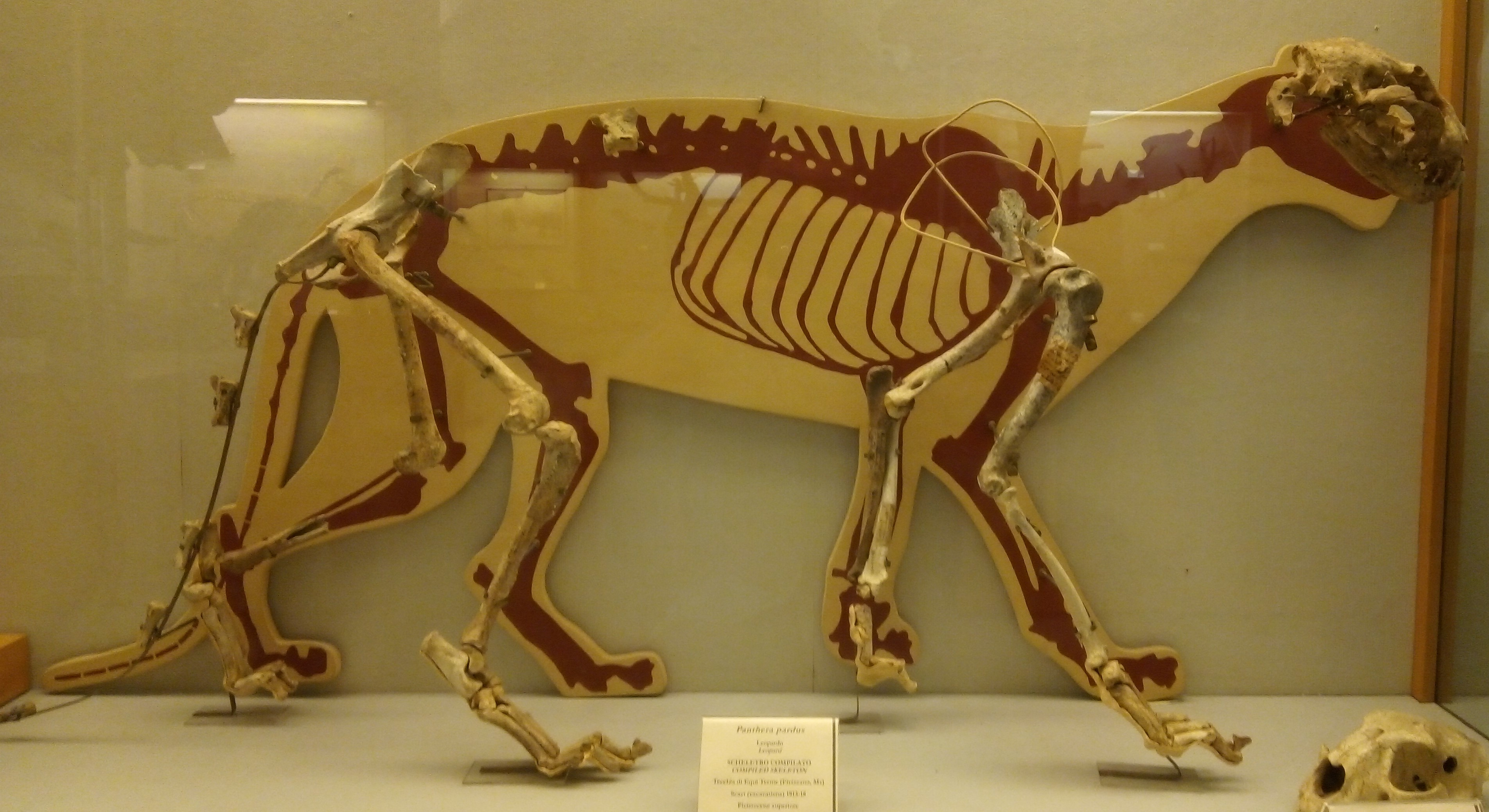
- Skeleton at the Museo di Storia Naturale di Firenze

Scientific classification
- Kingdom: Animalia
- Phylum: Chordata
- Class: Mammalia
- Order: Carnivora
- Family: Felidae
- Genus: Panthera
- Species: P. pardus
- Population: †European leopard

= European leopard =

Multiple subspecies of fossil leopard

Leopards have a long history in Europe, spanning from the Early-Middle Pleistocene transition, around 1.2–0.6 million years ago, until the end of the Late Pleistocene, around 12,000 years ago, and possibly later into the early Holocene. Remains of leopards have been found across Europe, from the Iberian Peninsula to the Caucasus.

== Taxonomy and genetics ==
The proposed Late Pleistocene European leopard subspecies Panthera pardus spelaea was first described as Felis pardus spelaea by Emil Bächler in 1936.

Several different leopard subspecies have been proposed including:

- Panthera pardus antiqua (Cuvier, 1835)
- Panthera pardus begoueni Fraipoint, 1923
- Panthera pardus sickenbergi Schutt, 1969
- Panthera pardus vraonensis Nagel, 1999
- Panthera pardus burgtonnae Hemmer and Kahlke, 2026

Analysis of mitochondrial genomes from Late Pleistocene European leopard specimens found in Baumannshöhle in Germany, dating to around 40,000 years ago, found that they shared a mitochondrial genome lineage that diverged from the common ancestor of living Asian leopards around 500,000 years ago, leading the authors of the study to propose that European leopards represented a distinct population from living Asian leopards. However, later analysis of two mitochondrial genomes obtained from sedimentary layers of El Miron cave in Spain (dating to approximately 46,890–33,160 and 22,980–22,240 calibrated years Before Present respectively) found that these sequences were each others closest relatives, but they did not group with those from Germany, and were instead within the living diversity of Asian leopard mitochondrial DNA sequences, and in particular shared a close common ancestry with a 35,000 year old leopard mitochondrial DNA sequence obtained from Mezmaiskaya cave in the northwest Caucasus.

== Description ==
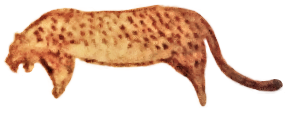
Paleolithic cave art of a leopard from Chauvet Cave, France

The skulls of Late Pleistocene European leopards are medium-long, and their characteristics are closest to the Panthera pardus tulliana subspecies. An apparent depiction of a leopard in the Chauvet Cave shows a coat pattern similar to that of modern leopards but with an unspotted belly, presumably white. As in modern leopards, there was a strong sexual dimorphism, with males being larger than females. Size is suggested to have varied based on temperature, with leopards during the Last Glacial Period suggested to have been larger than those from the Last Interglacial. A 2026 analysis found that Late Pleistocene European leopards (including those from the Last Interglacial and Last Glacial Period), overall are considerably larger than living leopard populations, approaching jaguars in size. Remains of Late Pleistocene European leopards from Equi cave in Italy exhibit considerable size variability. The muzzles of skulls from this locality are generally shorter than those of living leopards.

While Dietrich (2013), argued that earlier Middle Pleistocene European leopards differed in a number of morphological features of the skull and teeth from Late Pleistocene European leopards, other authors have argued that no such trends exist, and that this simply reflects intraspecific variability and that some Late Pleistocene European leopards have similar skull and teeth features to those of earlier Middle Pleistocene European leopards.

== Distribution and chronology ==
The timing of arrival of leopards in Europe is disputed. Some authors have posited that they arrived in Europe during the late Early Pleistocene around 1.2–1.1 million years ago. while others have suggested that they arrived during the early Middle Pleistocene, around 600,000 years ago. While initially very rare, records of leopards become more common and widely distributed from the late Middle Pleistocene onwards, following the extinction of the "European jaguar" Panthera gombaszoegensis, though their fossil record in Europe is still scarce overall. Northwards, leopards ranged to Great Britain, but their records here are rare and only recorded during Marine Isotope Stage 7 ~225,000 years ago. During the Late Pleistocene, their northern limit was around Berlin in northern Germany.

During the Last Glacial Maximum, leopards persisted in relatively temperate glacial refugia in the Iberian, Italian and Balkan Peninsulas. Bone fragments of P. p. spelaea have been excavated in Switzerland, Italy, Spain, Germany, Poland and Greece. Leopard fossils dating to ~43,000 BP were found in the Radochowska Cave in Poland. The most complete skeleton of P. p. spelaea is known from Vjetrenica Cave in southern Bosnia and Herzegovina, where four leopard fossils were found. These are dated to the end of the Late Pleistocene, about 29,000–37,000 years ago. A cave painting of a leopard in the Chauvet Cave in southern France is dated to about 25,000–37,500 years old. The last leopards vanished from most parts of Europe about 24,000 years ago, just before the Last Glacial Maximum.

The cave site of Equi in northwestern Italy, dating to the Last Glacial Period (MIS 3, ~53-27,000 years ago) represents the richest concentration of leopard remains from Pleistocene Europe, with some 200 bones of leopards having been excavated from the locality, including 5 well preserved skulls. The remains of cubs found in the cave suggests that leopards used it to give birth and rest. The youngest reliable records for leopards outside of eastern Europe are from the Iberian Peninsula, around 17–11,000 years ago, with records in the Iberian Peninsula possibly extending into the early Holocene, during the Mesolithic. Modern (Asian-type) leopards are still found on the fringes of Europe in the North Caucasus.

== Palaeobiology ==
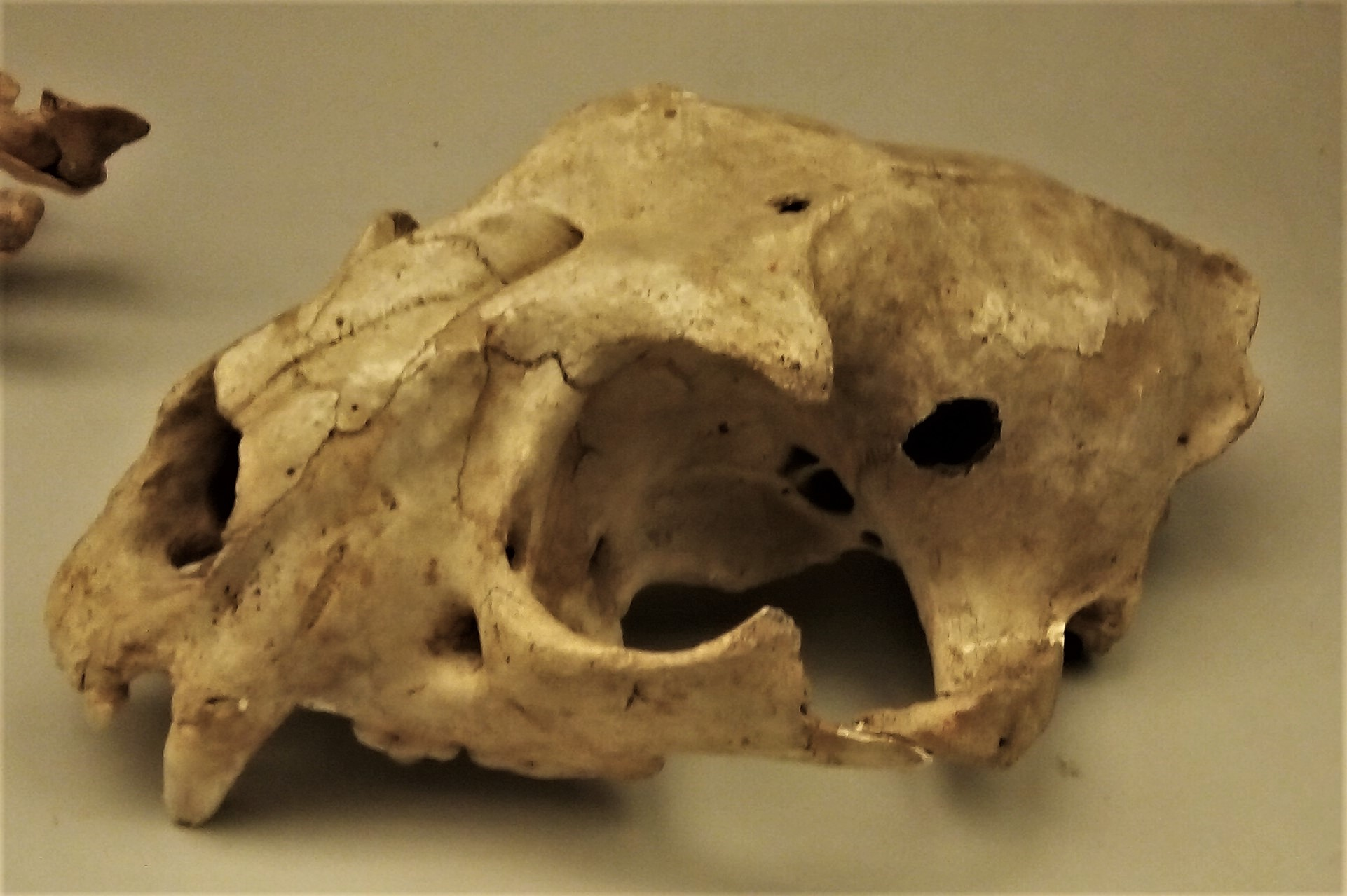
Skull with a hole determined to have been caused by a lion bite

Fossils of leopards in Europe are sometimes found in caves, where they apparently sought shelter or hid their prey. They generally preferred smaller caves, most likely because larger caves were usually occupied by larger predators such as cave bears, cave lions (P. spelaea), or humans. In European Ice Age caves, leopard bones are far rarer than those of lions, and all currently known fossils belong to adults, suggesting that they rarely, if ever, raised their cubs in caves. Where leopard remains are found in larger caves, they are often found in the cave's deeper recesses, as in Baumann's and Zoolithen Cave in Germany. It is not precisely known which prey species these leopards hunted, although they may have been similar to modern snow leopards, which prey on ibex, deer and wild boar. It is likely that leopards scavenged or occasionally killed cave bears during hibernation in their dens. During the cold phases, European leopards occurred mainly in mountain or alpine boreal forests or in mountains above the treeline, and were not usually found in the lowland mammoth steppes.

== See also ==
- Indian leopard
- Amur leopard
- African leopard
- Arabian leopard
- Indochinese leopard
- Javan leopard
- Sri Lankan leopard
- Zanzibar leopard
- Panthera pardus tulliana
- Chinese leopard
- European jaguar
