= Arabian leopard =

- Arabian leopard in Oman

Conservation status
- Critically Endangered (IUCN 3.1)

Scientific classification
- Kingdom: Animalia
- Phylum: Chordata
- Class: Mammalia
- Order: Carnivora
- Family: Felidae
- Genus: Panthera
- Species: P. pardus
- Subspecies: P. p. nimr

Trinomial name
- Panthera pardus nimr (Hemprich and Ehrenberg), 1833
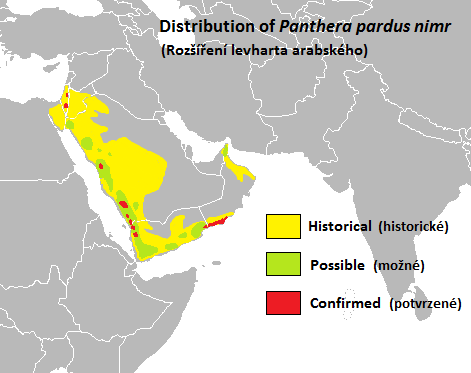
- Distribution of the Arabian leopard

Synonyms
- P. p. jarvisi Pocock, 1932

Subspecies of mammals

The Arabian leopard (Panthera pardus nimr) is the smallest leopard subspecies. It was described in 1830 and is native to the Arabian Peninsula, where it was widely distributed in rugged hilly and montane terrain until the late 1970s. Today, the population is severely fragmented and thought to decline continuously. In 2008, an estimated 45–200 individuals in three isolated subpopulations were restricted to western Saudi Arabia, Oman and Yemen. In 2023, it was estimated that in Oman and Yemen 100–120 leopards remain in total, including 70–84 mature individuals, and that this population is decreasing.

== Taxonomic history ==
Felis pardus nimr was the scientific name proposed by Wilhelm Hemprich and Christian Gottfried Ehrenberg in 1830 for a leopard from Arabia. Panthera pardus jarvisi, proposed by Reginald Innes Pocock in 1932, was based on a leopard skin from the Sinai Peninsula.

In the early 1990s, a phylogeographic analysis was carried out based on tissue samples from Asian and African leopards. P. p. jarvisi was provisionally grouped with Panthera pardus tulliana, as tissue samples were not available. Genetic analysis of a single wild leopard from South Arabia appeared most closely related to the African leopard, and Molecular biologists tentatively proposed in 2001 to group the Sinai leopard with the Arabian leopard, as again tissue samples were not available.

== Characteristics ==
The Arabian leopard's coat varies from light yellow to rich golden, tawny, or grey shades, with distinctive rosette patterns covering its fur. Males have a head-and-body length of 105–118 cm (41–46 in) and a tail length of 77–85 cm (30–33 in), weighing approximately 30 kg (66 lb). Females are slightly smaller, measuring 93–113 cm (37–44 in) in head-and-body length, with tails of 67–79 cm (26–31 in), and weighing around 20 kg (44 lb). The Arabian leopard is the smallest leopard subspecies, yet it is the largest feline species native to the Arabian Peninsula.

== Distribution and habitat ==
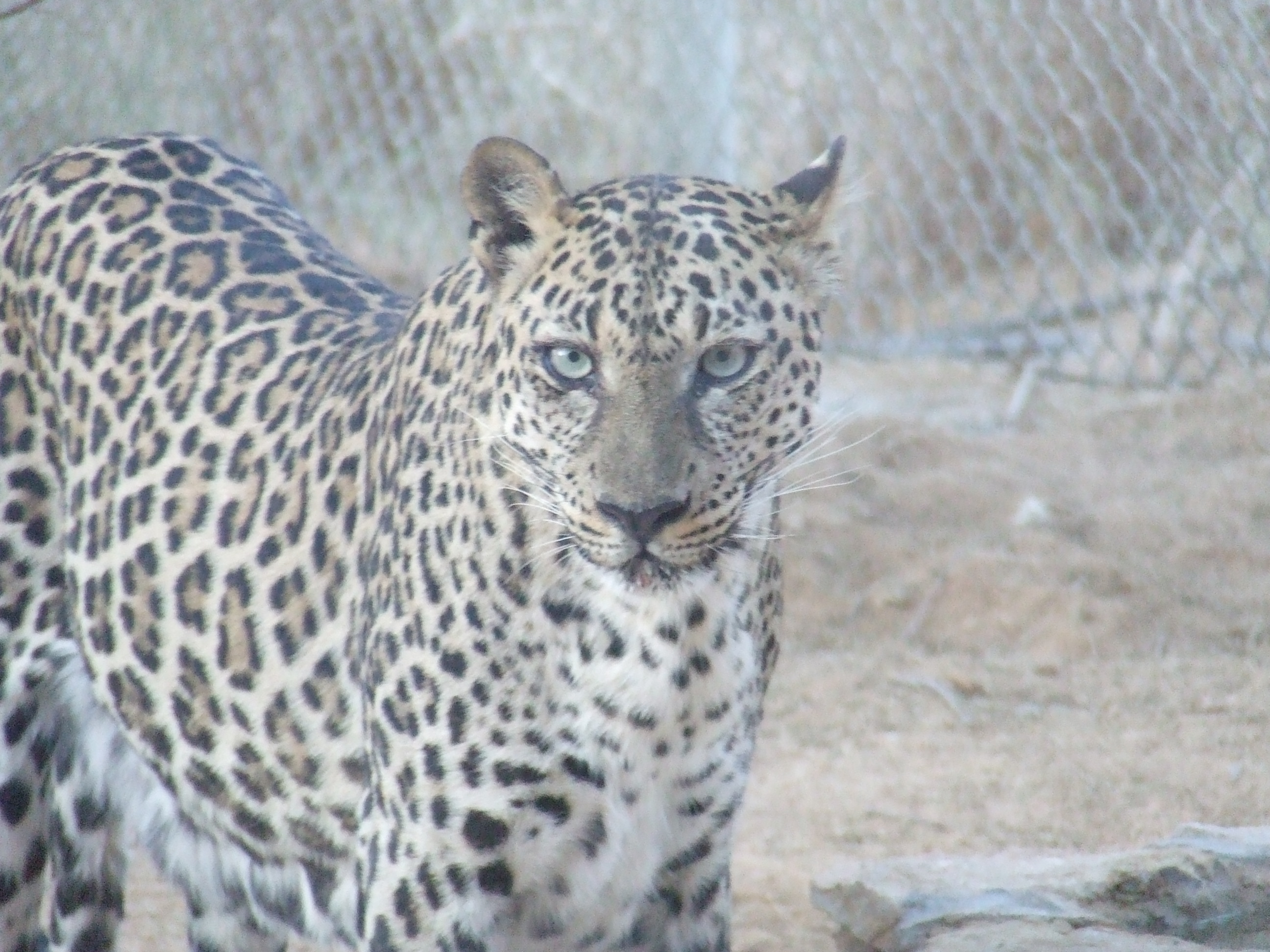
Captive leopard in the Breeding Centre for Endangered Wildlife, Sharjah

The geographic range of the Arabian leopard is poorly understood but generally considered to be limited to the Arabian Peninsula. It lives in mountainous uplands and hilly steppes, but seldom moves to open plains, desert or coastal lowlands.

Until the late 1960s, the Arabian leopard was widely distributed in the mountains along both the coasts of the Red Sea and Arabian Sea. It was not recorded in Egypt's Sinai Peninsula since the late 1990s. In Saudi Arabia, leopard habitat is estimated to have decreased by around 90% since the beginning of the 19th century. Of 19 reports obtained from informants between 1998 and 2003, only four are confirmed including sightings in one location in the Hijaz Mountains and three locations in the Asir Mountains, with the most recent record in 2002 south of Biljurashi. No leopard was recorded during a camera trapping survey conducted from 2002 to 2003. Although the leopard is officially protected in the country, its remaining range is not encompassed by protected areas.

In the United Arab Emirates, the Arabian leopard was first sighted in 1949 by Wilfred Thesiger in Jebel Hafeet. The exact status of the leopard in the country is unclear. It is either extinct or very rare in the eastern region, with occasional sightings being reported in places like Wadi Wurayah. Before the end of the 20th century, sightings were reported in the areas of Jebel Hafeet and Al-Hajar Mountains.

In Oman, leopards were reported to have occurred in the Hajar Mountains until the late 1970s. The largest confirmed sub-population inhabits the Dhofar Mountains in the country's southeast. In the Jabal Samhan Nature Reserve, 17 individual adult leopards were identified between 1997 and 2000 using camera traps. Leopards were also sighted in the Musandam Peninsula, particularly Ras Musandam. The home range of Arabian leopards in this reserve is roughly estimated at 350 km^{2} (140 sq mi) for males and 250 km^{2} (97 sq mi) for females. The Dhofar mountain range is considered the best habitat for leopards in the country. This rugged terrain provides shelters, shade and trapped water, and harbors a wide variety of prey species, in particular in escarpments and narrow wadis.

In Yemen, leopards formerly ranged in all mountainous areas of the country, including the western and southern highlands eastwards to the border with Oman. Since the early 1990s, leopards are considered rare and close to extinction due to direct persecution by local people and depletion of wild prey.

There was a small population in Israel's Negev desert, estimated at 20 individuals in the late 1970s. Leopards were hunted until the early 1960s. By 2002, fewer than 11 isolated individuals were estimated to survive. Six males, three females and two unsexed individuals were identified in the country, based on genetic analysis of 268 scats collected. About five individuals were thought to survive in the Judaean Desert as of 2005. The last wild leopard in the Negev desert was sighted near Sde Boker in 2007, which was in a poor and weak shape; and the last leopard in the northern Arabah Valley was sighted in 2010–11.

In Jordan, the last confirmed sighting of a leopard dates to 1987.

== Behaviour and ecology ==
Arabian leopards are predominantly nocturnal, but are sometimes also seen in daylight. They seem to concentrate on small to medium prey species, and usually store carcasses of large prey in caves or lairs but not in trees. Scat analyses revealed that the main prey species include Arabian gazelle, Nubian ibex, Cape hare, rock hyrax, porcupine, Ethiopian hedgehog, small rodents, birds, and insects. Since local people reduced ungulates to small populations, leopards are forced to alter their diet to smaller prey and livestock such as goats, sheep, donkeys and young camels.

Information about ecology and behaviour of Arabian leopards in the wild is very limited. A leopard from the Judean desert is reported to have come into heat in March. After a gestation period of 13 weeks, females give birth to two to four cubs in a cave amidst boulders or in a burrow.

Leopard cub in Saudia Arabia

Leopard cubs are born with closed eyes that open four to nine days later. Captive-born Arabian leopard cubs emerged from their den for the first time at the age of one month. Cubs are weaned at the age of about three months, and remain with their mother for up to two years.

== Threats ==
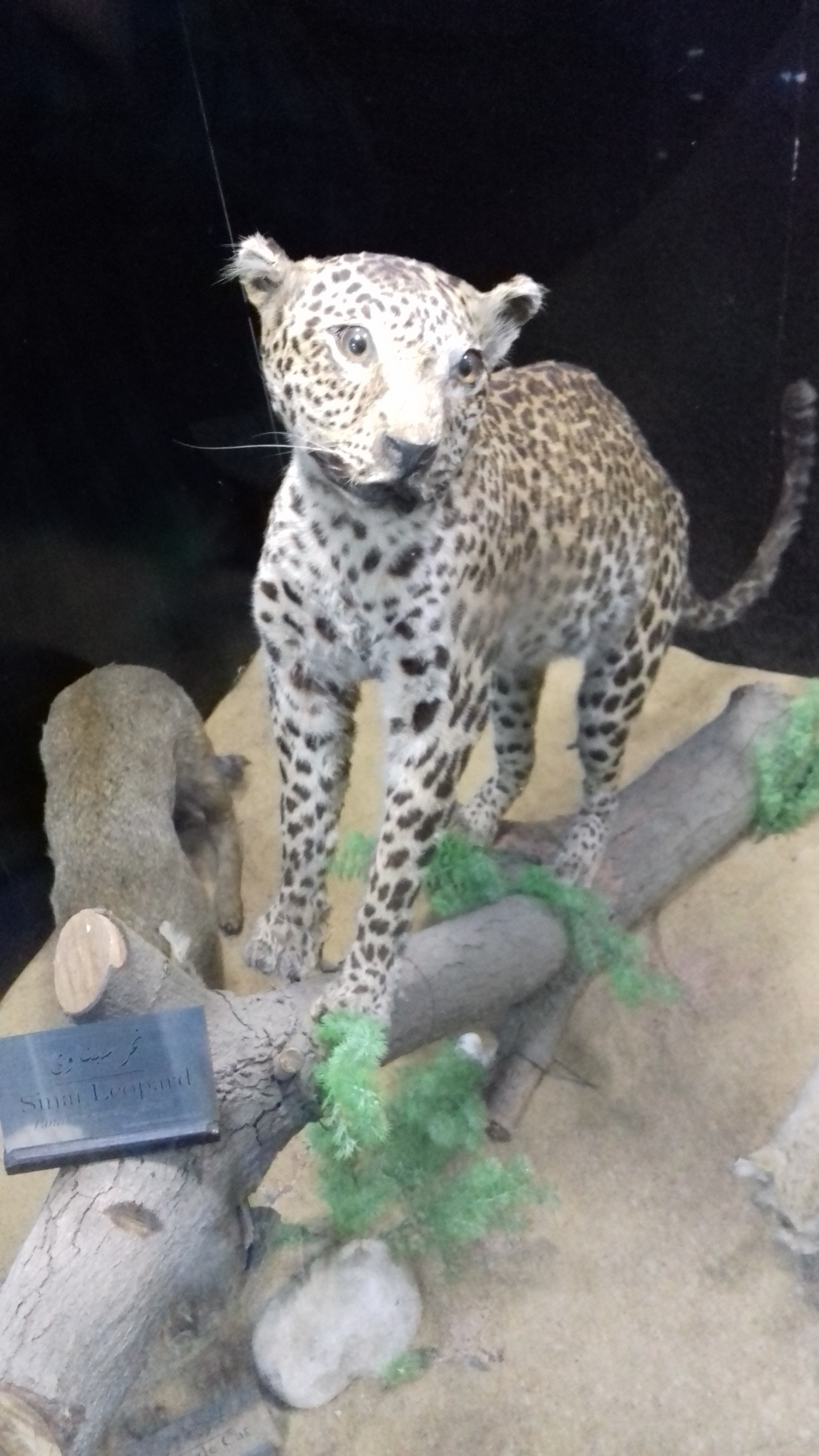
Stuffed leopard from the Sinai Peninsula in the Giza Zoological Museum, Egypt

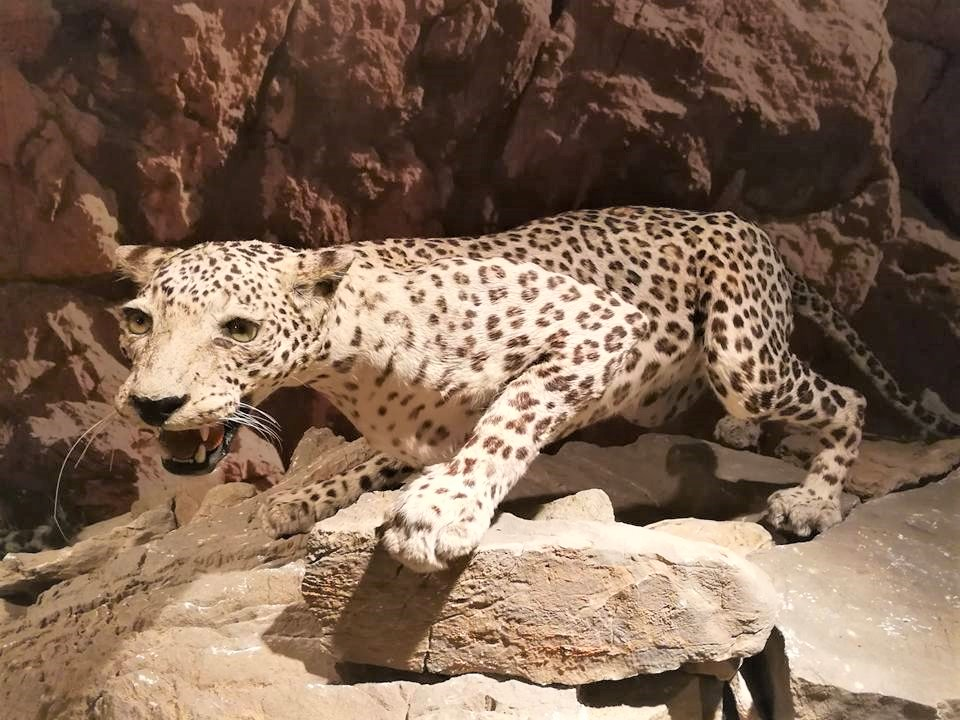
Taxidermied Arabian leopard at the Oman Natural History Museum in Muscat

The Arabian leopard is threatened by habitat loss, degradation and fragmentation; prey depletion caused by unregulated hunting; trapping for the illegal wildlife trade and retaliatory killing in defence of livestock.

In the 1950s, the Arabian leopard population was already decreasing due to habitat degradation and fragmentation, and killing of leopards and prey species. By 2002, the population had decreased drastically in Arabia as shepherds and villagers kill leopards in retaliation for attacks on livestock. In addition, hunting of leopard prey species such as hyrax and ibex by local people and habitat fragmentation, especially in the Sarawat Mountains, made the continued survival of the leopard population uncertain. Other reasons for killing leopards are for personal satisfaction and pride, traditional medicine and hides. Some leopards are killed accidentally when eating poisoned carcasses intended for Arabian wolf and striped hyena. In 2006, three confirmed separate subpopulations remained on the Arabian Peninsula with fewer than an estimated 200 leopards.

Among the products sold in the tent city of Mina, Saudi Arabia after the Hajj of 2010, skins of Arabian leopards that were poached in Yemen were offered.

The leopard population in Saudi Arabia was affected by the decrease of natural prey species so that leopards increasingly prey on livestock. Local people therefore consider leopards a threat and kill them either by using poison or snares. In 2018, it was considered close to extinction in the country. Between August 2020 and March 2022, surveys were conducted at 13 sites with 586 camera trap stations covering 4,189 km^{2} (1,617 sq mi) in the Hejaz and Asir Mountains, but they did not yield any evidence of a leopard.

In 2023, the Arabian leopard was classified as critically endangered on the IUCN Red List, as the total population was estimated at 100–120 individuals including 70–84 mature individuals in Oman and Yemen. The current population trend is thought to be decreasing.

== Conservation ==
The 4,500 km^{2} (1,700 sq mi) Jabal Samhan Nature Reserve was established in 1997 after camera trap records of leopards were obtained; in the following decade, 17 individual adult leopards and one cub were identified. Leopards were also radio-collared and tracked in this Nature Reserve.

At least ten wild leopards were live-captured in Yemen since the early 1990s and sold to zoos; some have been placed in conservation breeding centers in the UAE and Saudi Arabia.

A detailed study of leopard distribution and habitat requirement is needed for the management of the species. The ecological information needed includes data on feeding behavior, range use and reproduction. This information is of great importance to the survival of the species. There are many sites already surveyed and considered to be suitable for preservation for leopards in the plan adopted by the national commission for wildlife conservation and development. These areas include Jebel Fayfa, Jebel Al-Qahar, Jebel Shada, which has already been gazetted as a protected area, Jebel Nees, Jebel Wergan, Jebel Radwa and Harrat Uwayrid. The formal establishment of some of these areas is now urgent.

A successful conservation strategy must promote the awareness of the importance of leopard conservation, employing the media and perhaps other sources for basic education programs. The support and involvement of people living close to leopard habitats are vital in such efforts. This is true not only because they might affect the conservation of the leopard in one way or another, but also because they depend on their livestock which could be killed occasionally by leopards. Although it is not always practical, compensation for lost livestock from leopard predation should be considered.

Revenue from sources such as hunting rights and ecotourism, services such as roads and school employment in protected areas would encourage local residents to participate in leopard conservation. Furthermore, well-managed protected areas will ensure the continued survival of the species until other factors enhancing its survival become effective. Public awareness, fruitful consideration of the needs of local people and ecological studies may take years to be useful.

In Yemen, efforts are underway to conserve leopards at two sites, including Hawf Protected Area. In Saudi Arabia, authorities have undertaken efforts to create Sharaan Nature Reserve, a wildlife sanctuary for the leopard in the area of Al-`Ula.

In Israel, Arabian leopards are being bred in Yotvata Hai-Bar Nature Reserve for future reintroduction.

=== Arabian Leopard Day ===
Arabian Leopard Day Logo

In February 2022, the Council of Ministers of Saudi Arabia declared 10 February as the "Arabian Leopard Day" in an effort to protect it and raise awareness of its conservation status. On the second Arabian Leopard Day in February 2023, the Royal Commission for Al-'Ula created a $25 million fund to promote conservation efforts and signed a 10-year deal with Panthera Corporation worth $20 million. In June 2023, The United Nations voted to adopt a resolution to officially designate 10 February as an international day for the Arabian leopard.

=== In captivity ===
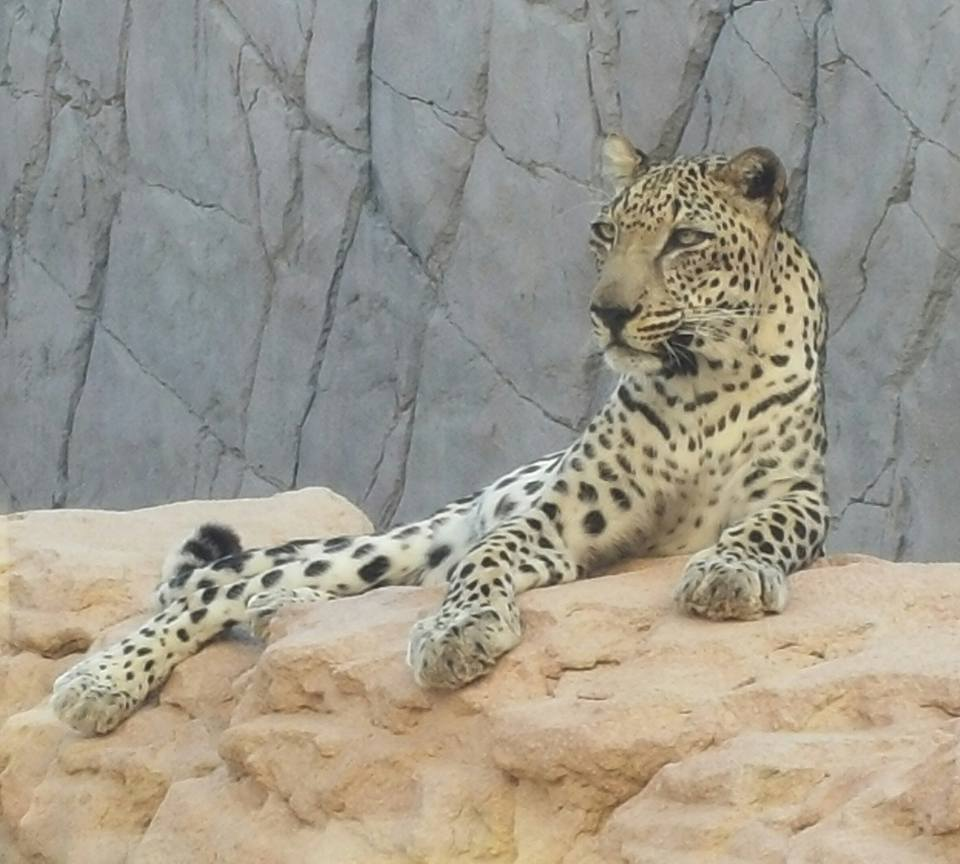
Leopard at the former Arabia's Wildlife Centre in Sharjah, the UAE

The first Arabian leopards were captured in southern Oman and registered in the studbook in 1985. Captive breeding was initiated in 1995 at the Oman Mammal Breeding Centre and is operated at a regional level on the Arabian Peninsula. Since 1999, the regional studbook is coordinated and managed by personnel of the Breeding Centre for Endangered Arabian Wildlife, Sharjah. As of 2010, nine institutions participated in the breeding programme and kept 42 males, 32 females, and three unsexed leopards, of which 19 were wild caught. This captive population comprised 14 founders that have an unequal number of descendants. In 2016, the leopards and other fauna were transferred from the breeding centre in Sharjah to Al Hefaiyah Conservation Centre in the eastern area of Kalba.

In Yemen, leopards were kept at Ta'izz and Sana'a Zoos. Two cubs were born on 26 April 2019 at the Prince Saud Al-Faisal Wildlife Research Center in Ta'if.

== See also ==
- National symbols of Yemen
- African leopard
- Amur leopard
- Panthera pardus tulliana
- Indian leopard
- Indochinese leopard
- Javan leopard
- Sri Lankan leopard
- Zanzibar leopard
- Panthera pardus spelaea
