= Anjali Watson =

Sri Lankan conservationist

- Born: Sri Lanka
- Education: The University of Edinburgh, McMaster University
- Known for: Leopard conservation
- Spouse: Andrew Kittle
- Children: 2
- Awards: Whitley Award 2018. 2022 WFN Continuation Fund
- Scientific career
- Fields: Ecology
- Website: wwct.org

Anjali Watson is a Sri Lankan conservationist. She is known for her contributions to leopard conservation and founded the Wilderness and Wildlife Conservation Trust, a conservation and research organisation.

== Education ==
Watson graduated with an Honours degree in Environmental Studies and Geography from McMaster University and holds a Masters of Science in ecology from the University of Edinburgh. Her primary education was at Ladies College, Colombo.

== Career ==
In 2000, she initiated the Leopard Project which is now under the Wilderness and Wildlife Conservation Trust (wwct.org). Watson's work involves understanding the ecology and land-use of leopards and using this knowledge gained to influence landscape level Conservative. Fostering co-existence between humans and leopards (Panthera pardus kotiya) with a current focus in the Central Highlands of Sri Lanka which is a UNESCO World Heritage Site.

In 2004, she co founded the Wilderness and Wildlife Conservation Trust which is a research for Conservation group that focuses its research on the country's Apex predator, the leopard. WWCT, in addition to investigating leopard diet and prey, behaviour and general biodiversity surveys, collects data through the use of motion censor camera technology to investigate and identify movement corridors and refugia in new unprotected areas of land where leopards survive. WWCT also works within the protected area landscape.

== Awards and recognition ==
In 2018, she won the Whitely Award. and in 2022 she obtained continuation funding from the Whitley Fund for Nature. Watson was featured in the Cosmopolitan Magazine Sri Lanka's inaugural 35 under 35 list. In 2021 she was featured on CNN s call to earth.

== Publications ==
- Forest cover and level of protection influence the island-wide distribution of an apex carnivore and umbrella species, the Sri Lannkan leopard (Panthera pardus kotiya).
- Density of leopards (Panthera pardus kotiya) in Horton Plains National Park in the Central Highlands of Sri Lanka.
- The ecology and behaviour of a protected area Sri Lankan leopard (Panthera pardus kotiya) population.
- Notes on the status, distribution and abundance of the Sri Lankan leopard in the central hills of Sri Lanka.
- Mapping black panthers: Macroecological modeling of melanism in leopards (Panthera pardus).

== See also ==
- Sri Lankan Leopard
