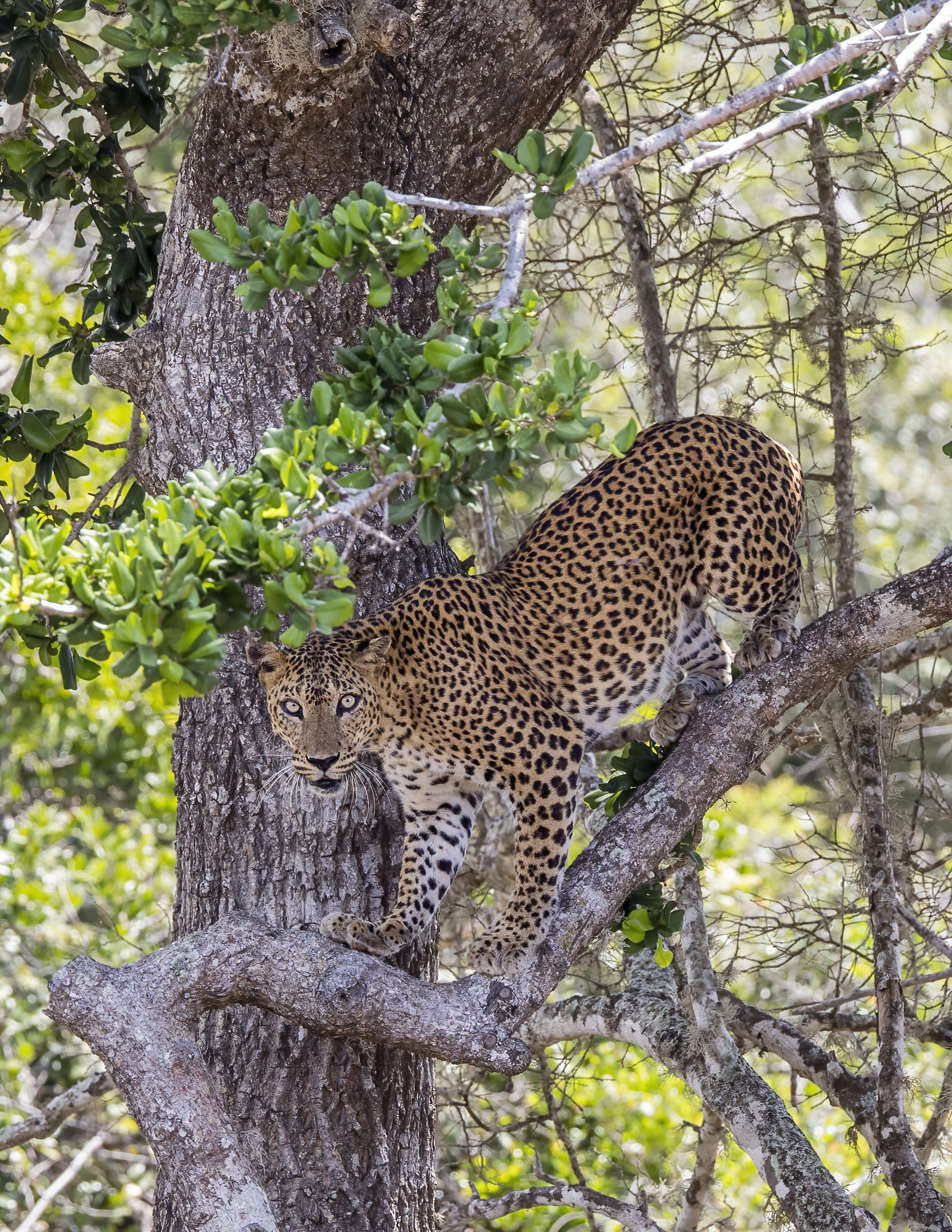
- Sri Lankan leopard in Yala National Park

Conservation status
- Vulnerable (IUCN 3.1)

Scientific classification
- Kingdom: Animalia
- Phylum: Chordata
- Class: Mammalia
- Infraclass: Placentalia
- Order: Carnivora
- Family: Felidae
- Genus: Panthera
- Species: P. pardus
- Subspecies: P. p. kotiya

Trinomial name
- Panthera pardus kotiya Deraniyagala, 1956

= Sri Lankan leopard =

Leopard subspecies

The Sri Lankan leopard (Panthera pardus kotiya) is a leopard subspecies native to Sri Lanka. It was first described in 1956 by Sri Lankan zoologist Paulus Edward Pieris Deraniyagala.

Since 2020, the Sri Lankan leopard has been listed as Vulnerable on the IUCN Red List, as the population is estimated at less than 800 mature individuals, and is probably declining.

== Characteristics ==
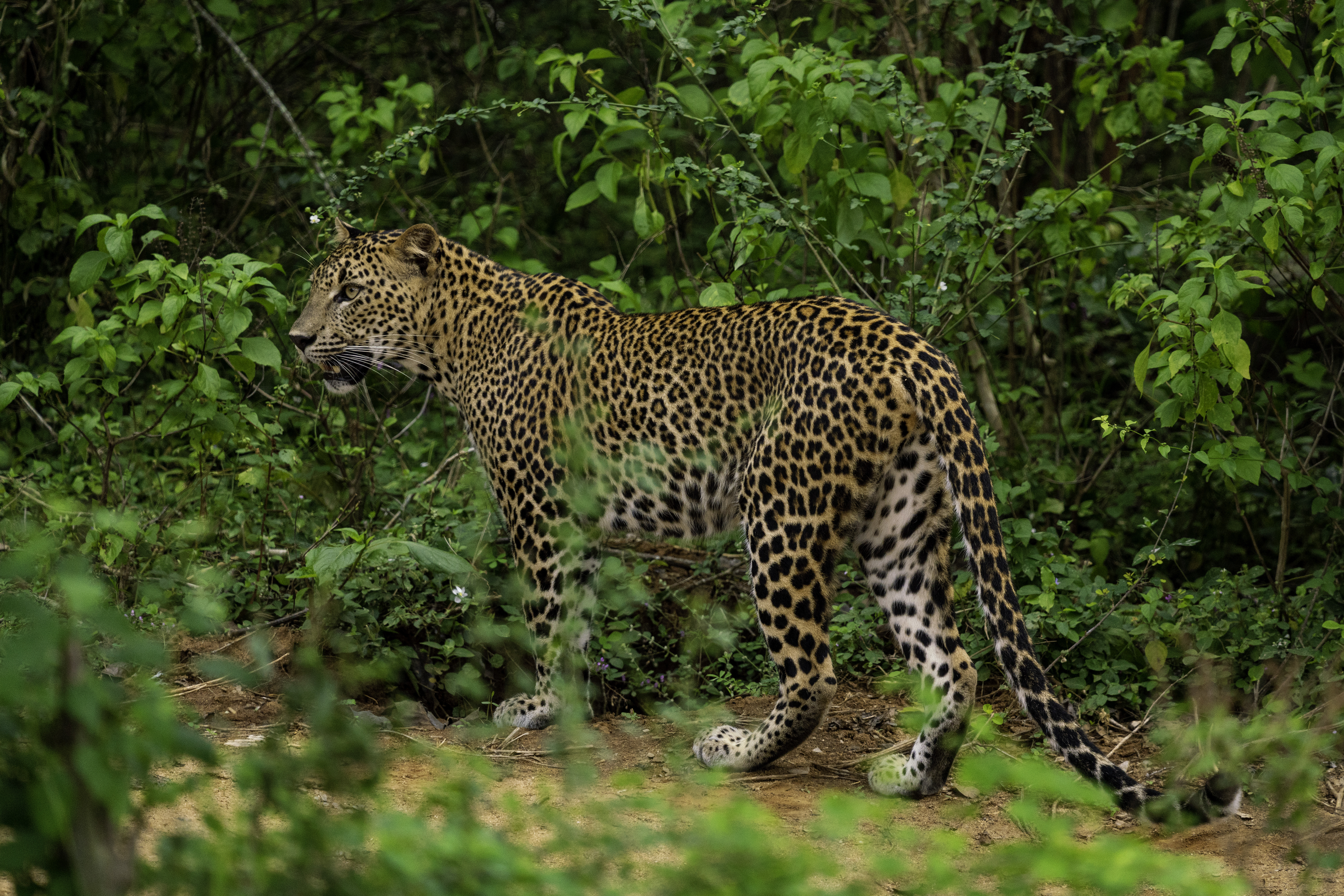
Female in Yala National Park

The Sri Lankan leopard has a tawny or rusty yellow coat with dark spots and close-set rosettes. Seven females measured in the early 20th century averaged a weight of 64 lb (29 kg) and had a mean head-to-body-length of 1.04 m (3 ft 5 in) with a 77.5 cm (2 ft 6.5 in) long tail, the largest being 1.14 m (3 ft 9 in) with a 84 cm (2 ft 9 in) long tail; 11 males averaged 56 kg (124 lb), the largest being 77 kg (170 lb), and measured 1.27 m (4 ft 2 in) with a 86 cm (2 ft 10 in) long tail, the largest being 1.42 m (4 ft 8 in) with a 97 cm (3 ft 2 in) long tail. The Sri Lankan leopard has possibly evolved to become a rather large leopard subspecies, because it is the apex predator in the country. Large males have been suggested to reach almost 100 kg (220 lb), but evidence for this is lacking.

Melanistic leopards are rare. Few records exist, including from Mawuldeniya, Pitadeniya, and Nallathanniya. In October 2019, the Department of Wildlife Conservation recorded live footage of a melanistic individual for the first time, a male.

== Distribution and habitat ==
The Sri Lankan leopard is still found in all habitats throughout the island in both protected and unprotected areas. These habitat types can be broadly categorised into:

- Arid zone with <1,000 mm (39 in) rainfall
- Dry zone with 1,000–2,000 mm (39–79 in) rainfall
- Wet zone with >2,000 mm (79 in) rainfall

In Sri Lanka's central hills, leopards have been recorded in forest patches, tea estates, grasslands, home gardens, and pine and eucalyptus plantations.

== Ecology and behaviour ==
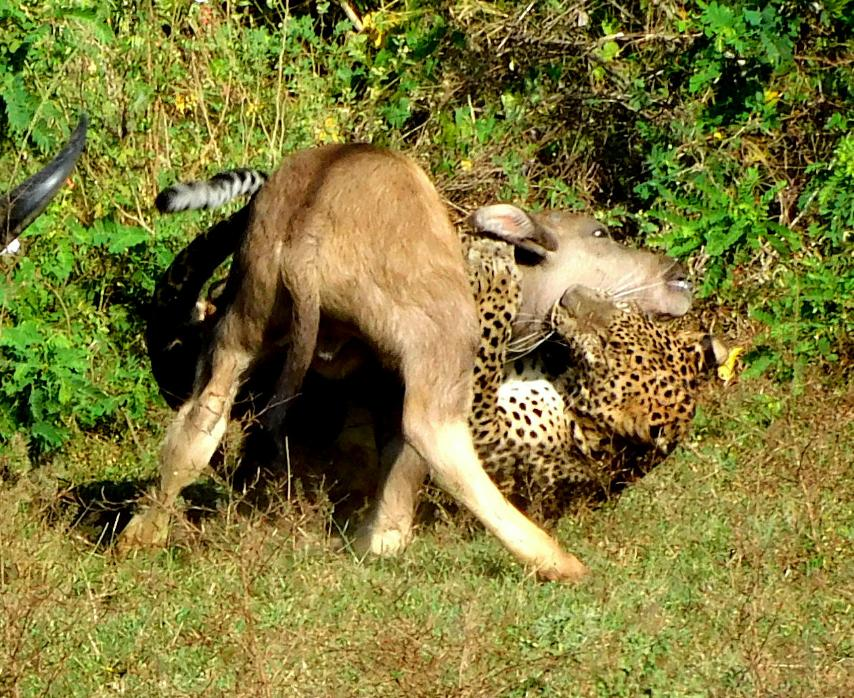
Leopard attacking an Asian water buffalo calf

In Yala National Park, the Sri Lankan leopard as in other locations, is a solitary hunter, with the exception of females with young. Male's ranges typically overlap the smaller ranges of several females, as well as portions of the ranges of neighboring males, although exclusive core areas are apparent. They are more active and prefer hunting at night, but are also somewhat active during dawn, dusk, and daytime hours. They do not usually store their kills in trees, perhaps because similarly-sized or larger carnivores are absent in Sri Lanka. In 2001 to 2002, adult resident leopard density was estimated at 12.1 mature individuals and 21.7 individuals of all ages per 100 km^{2} (39 sq mi) in Block I of Yala National Park.

The Sri Lankan leopard hunts by silently stalking its prey, until it is within striking distance, when it unleashes a burst of speed to quickly pursue and pounce on its victim. The prey is usually dispatched with a single bite to the throat. Like most cats, it is pragmatic in its choice of diet, which can include small mammals, birds, and reptiles, as well as larger animals. Sri Lankan axis deer make up the majority of its diet in the dry zone. The animal also preys on sambar, barking deer, wild boar, and monkeys.

No birth season or peak is apparent, with births occurring across the year. Its lifespan ranges from 12 to 15 years in the wild, and up to 22 years in captivity.

The leopard is sympatric with the Sri Lankan sloth bear.

== Threats ==
The survival of the Sri Lankan leopard is primarily threatened by increasing habitat loss and fragmentation, together with an increasing risk of human-induced mortality. Leopards are killed by people either accidentally in wire snares set for other species, or as retaliation after livestock depredation (usually through poisoning the livestock carcass). They are also occasionally shot. Since 2010, over 90 leopards are known to have been killed by people in Sri Lanka.

Three individuals were killed by snare traps in the Sinharaja conservation area, one of which is stuffed and displayed at the Giritale Wildlife Museum. In May 2020, the melanistic leopard filmed in 2019 was found caught in a snare at the Lakshapana Estate in Nallathanniya, Hatton. Later, it was transported to Elephant Transit Home in Udawalawa for treatment, where it died. The snare had heavily injured its neck. Even in large, contiguous protected areas, human encroachment in the border areas is impacting leopard distribution and reducing the effective size of these protected areas.

== Conservation ==
Ongoing research into the Sri Lankan leopard is needed to ensure that conservation measures are targeted and effective. The Leopard Project under the Wilderness and Wildlife Conservation Trust (WWCT), founded by Anjali Watson, and Dr. Andrew Kittle is working closely with the Government of Sri Lanka to ensure this occurs. The Sri Lanka Wildlife Conservation Society will also undertake some studies. The WWCT is engaged throughout the island with targeted work ongoing in the central hills region where fragmentation of the leopard's habitat is rapidly occurring.

=== Historical documentation ===
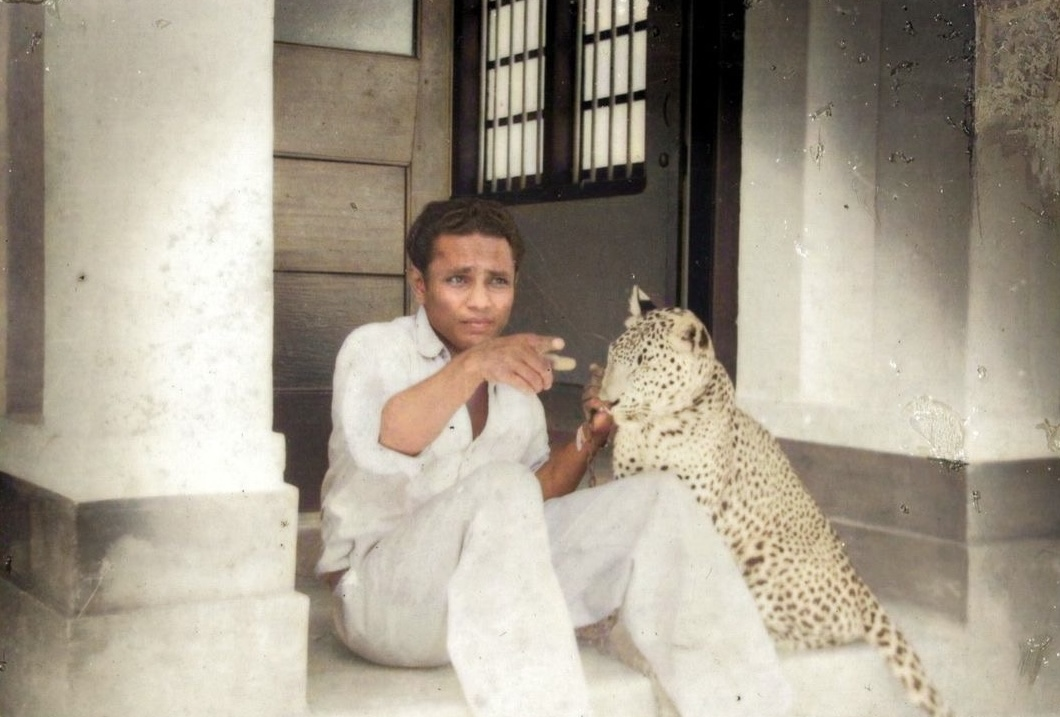
Game ranger Liyanage John Stanley Fernando with a rescued leopard cub at Yala National Park (1958). Colourised from a family archive.

A 1958 photograph from Yala National Park shows game ranger Liyanage John Stanley Fernando with a rescued Sri Lankan leopard (Panthera pardus kotiya) cub, illustrating early conservation practice in Sri Lanka. Taken two years after the subspecies was formally described, the image is an early surviving visual record of the Sri Lankan leopard in a conservation context.

=== In captivity ===
As of December 2011, 75 captive Sri Lankan leopards were in zoos worldwide. Within the European Endangered Species Programme, 27 male, 29 female and 8 unsexed individuals are kept.

== See also ==
- Indian leopard
- Amur leopard
- Panthera pardus tulliana
- Arabian leopard
- Indochinese leopard
- Javan leopard
- African leopard
- Zanzibar leopard
- Panthera pardus spelaea
- Chinese leopard
