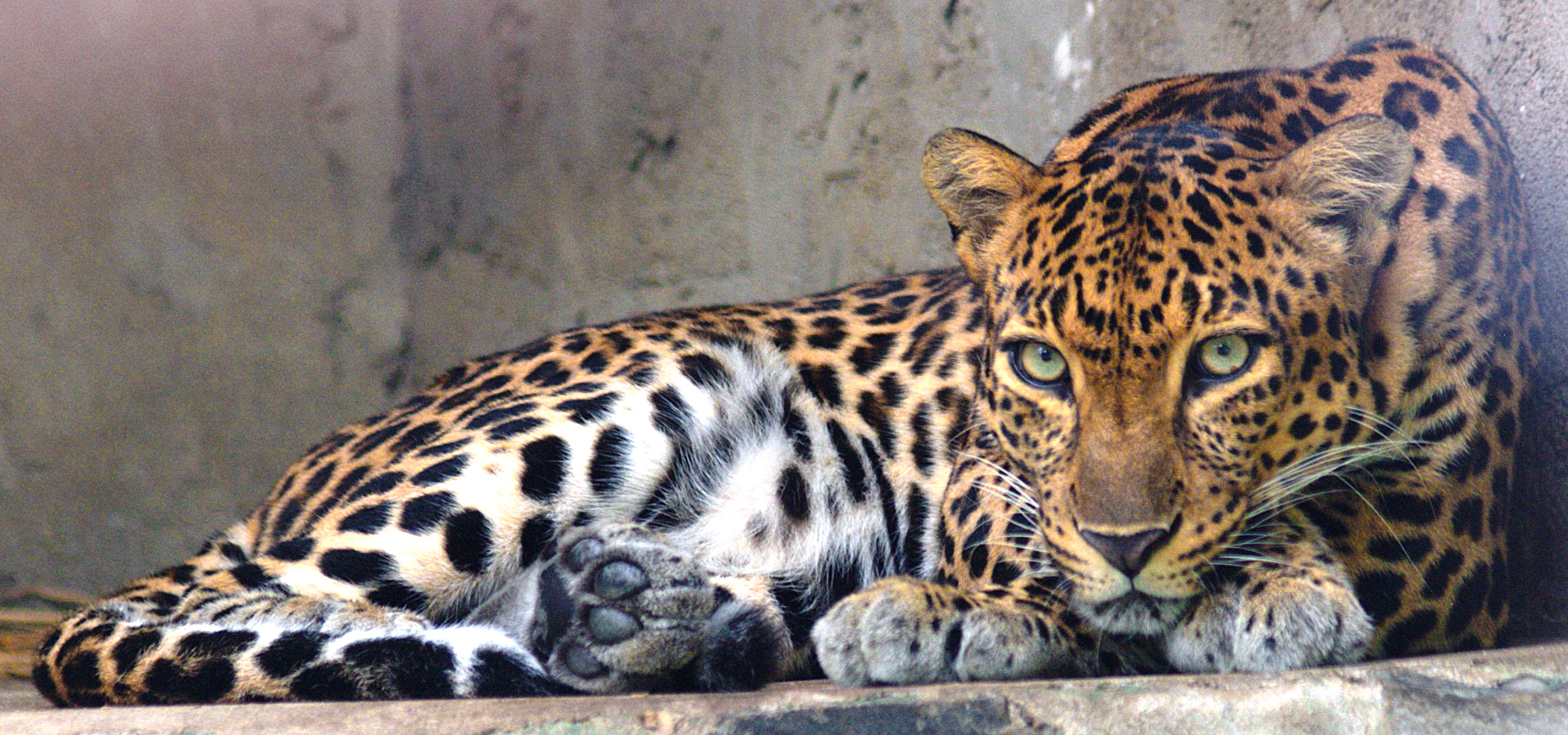
- An Indochinese leopard at Saigon Zoo and Botanical Gardens

Conservation status
- Critically Endangered (IUCN 3.1)

Scientific classification
- Kingdom: Animalia
- Phylum: Chordata
- Class: Mammalia
- Order: Carnivora
- Family: Felidae
- Genus: Panthera
- Species: P. pardus
- Subspecies: P. p. delacouri

Trinomial name
- Panthera pardus delacouri Pocock, 1930

= Indochinese leopard =

Leopard subspecies

The Indochinese leopard (Panthera pardus delacouri) is a leopard subspecies native to mainland Southeast Asia and southern China. In Indochina, leopards are rare outside protected areas and threatened by habitat loss due to deforestation as well as poaching for the illegal wildlife trade. In 2016, the population was previously thought to comprise 973–2,503 mature individuals, with only 409–1,051 breeding adults. The historical range had decreased by more than 90%. However, as of 2019, it is estimated that there are 77-766 mature Indochinese leopards and that their numbers are decreasing.

== Taxonomy ==
Panthera pardus delacouri was described in 1930 by Reginald Innes Pocock based on a leopard skin from Annam.

== Characteristics ==
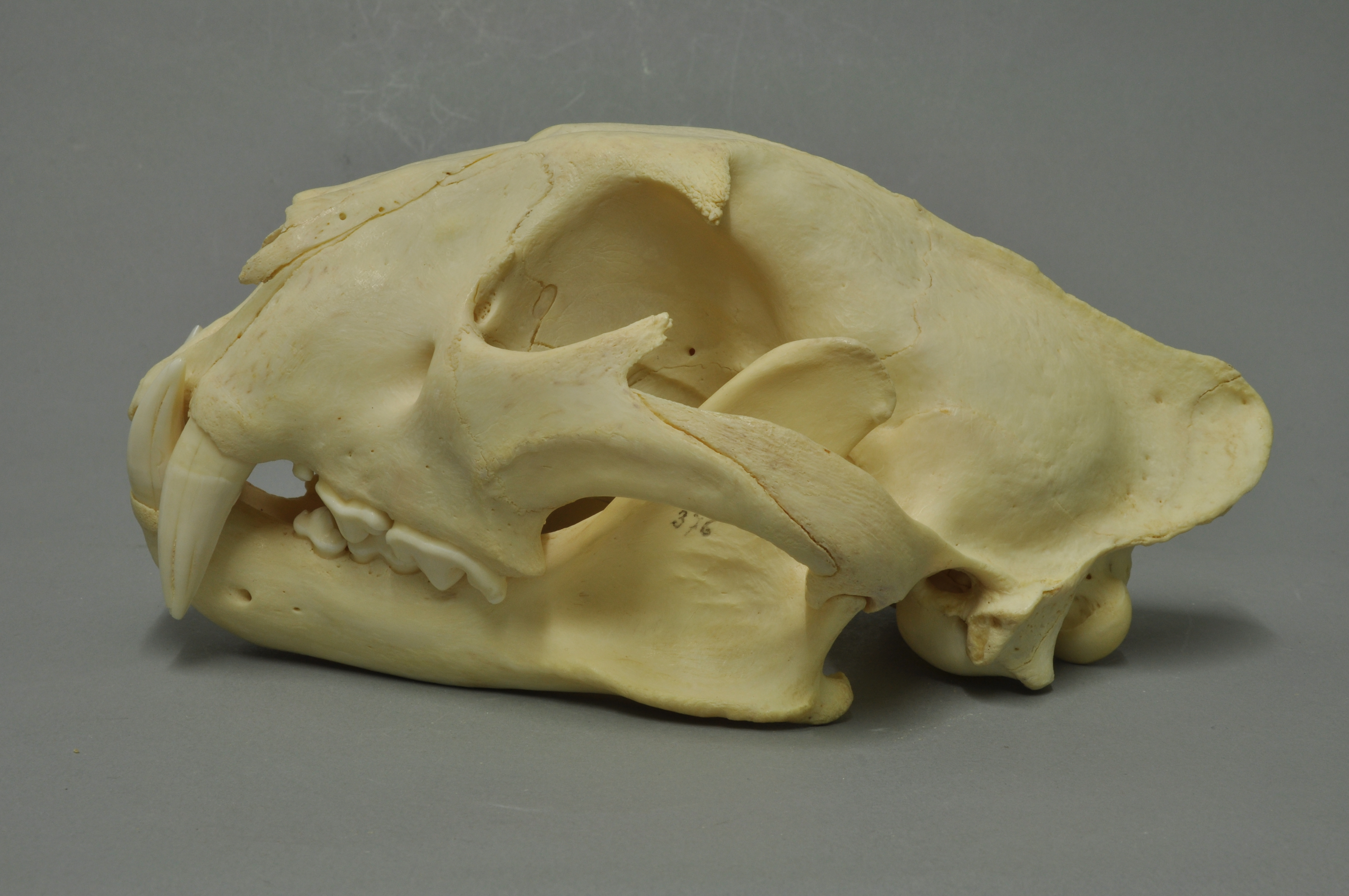
Skull of an Indochinese leopard at Museum Wiesbaden

Pocock described an Indochinese leopard skin as almost rusty-red in ground colour but paler at the sides. It had small rosettes that were mostly 3.8 cm × 3.8 cm (1.5 in × 1.5 in) in diameter and so closely set that it looked dark. The fur was short with less than 2.5 cm (0.98 in) long hair on the back. He commented to have seen only black leopards from Johor and other areas in the Malay Peninsula exhibited in menageries. He therefore assumed that the proportion of black leopards increases farther south.

Records from camera trapping studies conducted at 22 locations in southern Thailand and peninsular Malaysia between 1996 and 2009 show that Indochinese leopards recorded north of the Kra Isthmus are predominantly spotted. South of the Isthmus, only melanistic leopards were recorded. Melanism is quite common in dense tropical forest habitat, and black leopards are thought to have a selective advantage for ambush.

== Distribution and habitat ==
The Indochinese leopard is distributed in Southeast Asia, where today small populations remain only in Myanmar, Thailand, Peninsular Malaysia, Cambodia and southern China.

In Myanmar's Chatthin Wildlife Sanctuary, the leopard population declined so drastically between the 1940s and 1980s, that by 2000 it was estimated as being close to locally extinct. In 2015, leopards were recorded for the first time by camera traps in the hill forests of Karen State. The Northern Tenasserim Forest Complex on the Thailand-Myanmar border was considered a stronghold in 2016.

In Thailand, the Indochinese leopard is present in the Western Forest Complex, Kaeng Krachan-Kui Buri and Khlong Saeng-Khao Sok protected area complexes. But since the turn of the 21st century, it has not been recorded any more in the northern and south-central forest complexes of the country. In Hala Bala Wildlife Sanctuary on the Thai-Malaysian border, only two leopards walked past camera traps deployed between October 2004 and October 2007.

In Malaysia, the leopard is present in Belum-Temengor, Taman Negara and Endau-Rompin National Parks. In April 2010, a spotted leopard was seen in a camera trap in Taman Negara National Park, where previously only black leopards were thought to occur. It has also been recorded in secondary forests in Selangor and Johor states.

In Laos, 25 different leopards walked past camera traps set up over an area of 500 km^{2} (190 sq mi) in the Nam Et-Phou Louey National Biodiversity Conservation Area between April 2003 and June 2004. In 2010, leopards were reported to also occur in Nam Kan National Protected Area. Due to absence of records, leopards are suspected to have been extirpated in the country as of 2019.

In Cambodia, leopards were recorded in deciduous dipterocarp forest in Phnom Prich Wildlife Sanctuary between December 2008 and August 2009, and in Sre Pok Wildlife Sanctuary in 2009 and 2014. In 2021, no individual was detected in eastern Cambodia, indicating that this population was also extirpated.

In southern China, camera trap surveys were conducted in 11 nature reserves between 2002 and 2009, but leopards were only recorded in Changqing National Nature Reserve in the Qinling Mountains.

The leopard is extinct in Vietnam and Singapore.

== Ecology and behaviour ==
Since the mid-1980s, leopard-oriented field research was carried out in three protected areas in Thailand:

- Between 1985 and 1986, leopard scats were collected in an evergreen dipterocarp mountain forest in Chiang Mai Province of northwestern Thailand. Prey species found in scats comprised foremost Indian muntjac, followed by wild boar, long-tailed goral, dusky leaf monkey, Malayan porcupine, and Indian hog deer only in the hot season from February to April.
- In 1996, three leopards were fitted with radio collars in the south–central part of Kaeng Krachan National Park, a hilly terrain with seasonal evergreen forest. The study revealed home ranges of two male leopards of 14.6–18.0 km^{2} (5.6–6.9 sq mi), and of a female of 8.8 km^{2} (3.4 sq mi). They all preferred habitat where prey species accumulated and offered potential hunting opportunities, namely at altitudes of 500–600 m (1,600–2,000 ft), river and valley corridors, and the main road, prior to higher elevations and forested terrain. Both male leopards slightly extended their home range during the wet season of June to October. Sambar deer, red muntjac, Malayan porcupine and gaur are the most abundant potential prey species in this protected area.
- Between 1994 and 1999, ten leopards were fitted with radio collars in the northwestern part of Huai Kha Khaeng Wildlife Sanctuary and followed over 9–41 months. The analysis of tracking data revealed mean annual home ranges of adult males of 35.2–64.6 km^{2} (13.6–24.9 sq mi). Six adult females had the largest in Asia recorded home ranges of 17.8–34.2 km^{2} (6.9–13.2 sq mi), which they all extended in the dry season from November to April. All leopards preferred dry evergreen and mixed deciduous forest with flat slope near water courses.

Wild boar, macaque and lesser mouse deer were identified as the main potential prey species for the leopard in a highly fragmented secondary forest in Malaysia's Selangor area.

== Threats ==
There are few contiguous areas left where leopards have a chance of long-term survival. They are primarily threatened by habitat destruction following large–scale deforestation, and prey depletion through illegal hunting.

An increasingly growing threat is hunting for the illegal wildlife trade, which is showing its potential to do maximum harm in minimal time. Leopards are increasingly being used as substitutes for tiger parts in traditional Chinese medicine, with the price of leopard parts rising as tiger parts become scarce.

=== Habitat destruction ===
Human traffic inside protected areas negatively affects leopard movements and activity. They show less diurnal activity in areas more heavily used by people. In villages located in Laos' protected areas, local people consume about 28.2 kg (62 lb) meat of deer and wild boar annually per household. This offtake amounts to 2,840 kg (6,260 lb) ungulates per 100 km^{2} (39 sq mi), which is equivalent to the meat required to sustain several leopards per 100 km^{2} (39 sq mi).

In a highly fragmented tropical rain forest within Malaysia's capital agglomeration of Klang Valley leopard density has been estimated at 28.35 individuals per 100 km^{2} (39 sq mi), which is one of the highest leopard densities reported. As a result of rapid shrinking of the forests, individuals may have been pushed into the remaining forest in this area, so that their population is unexpectedly high. Leopards were mostly affected by construction activities conducted inside the forest.

=== Illegal wildlife trade ===
Substantial domestic skin markets exist in Myanmar, in Malaysia for traditional medicines, and in China for skins and bones, the latter particularly as a substitute for the tiger in traditional Asian medicines and tonics. In China, the use of stockpiles of leopard bone is still permitted by the government by medicinal manufacturers, despite the domestic trade ban.

In Myanmar, 215 body parts of at least 177 leopards were observed in four markets surveyed between 1991 and 2006. Among the body parts, a leopard penis and testes were openly traded, along with other parts of freshly killed animals. Three of the surveyed markets are situated on international borders with China and Thailand, and attract international buyers, although leopards are completely protected under Myanmar's national legislation. Effective implementation and enforcement of CITES is considered inadequate.

In early 2018, the carcass of a black leopard was discovered in Thailand's Thung Yai Naresuan Wildlife Sanctuary, along with other animals. They were in the possession of a businessman who presided over the construction company Italian-Thai Development.

== See also ==
- Indian leopard
- Amur leopard
- Panthera pardus tulliana
- Arabian leopard
- African leopard
- Javan leopard
- Sri Lankan leopard
- Zanzibar leopard
- Panthera pardus spelaea
- Chinese leopard
