= Chinese leopard =

Three leopard subspecies

The term “Chinese leopard” refers to any of the following three leopard (Panthera pardus) subspecies present over several regions within China:

- the Indian leopard (P. p. fusca) occurs as far north as southern Tibet, in the uppermost reaches of its natural range; it has also been recorded in Qomolangma National Nature Preserve.
- the Amur leopard (P. p. orientalis) occurs in small numbers close to the Amur River area of far Eastern Russia and Manchuria, including Jilin Province in northern China, where it has been recorded by camera-traps in Hunchun National Nature Reserve. Leopards and other Siberian wildlife freely roams between China, Russia and North Korea using the Tumen River, despite a tall, lengthy wire fence marking the international boundary.
- the Indochinese leopard (P. p. delacouri) ranges from mainland Southeast Asia into Yunnan Province in southern China, where the Pearl River is thought to form a natural border to the leopard populations farther north.
