= Hunchun National Nature Reserve =

Protected area in China

- Chinese: 珲春国家级自然保护区
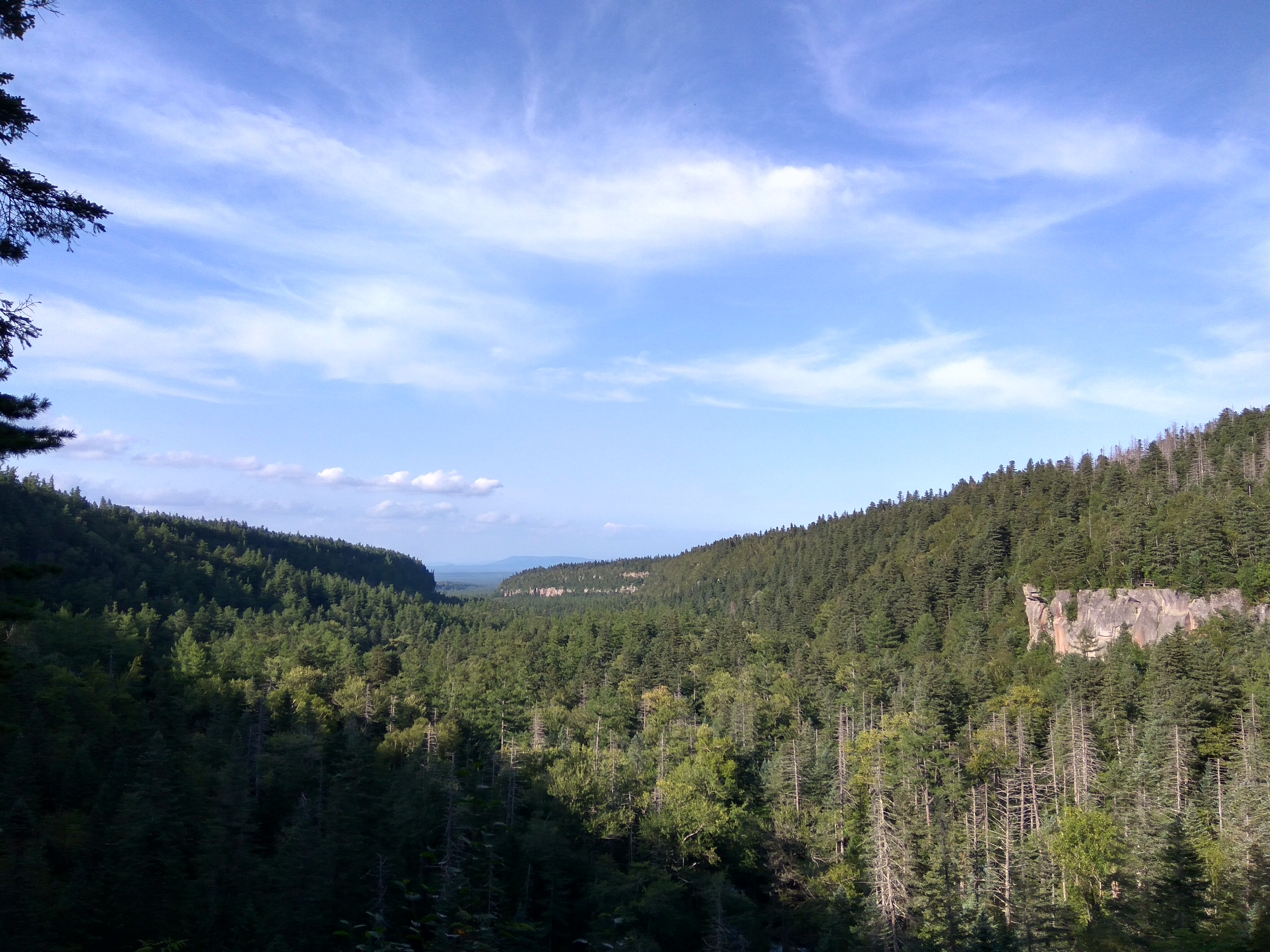
- Landscape in Changbai Mountains

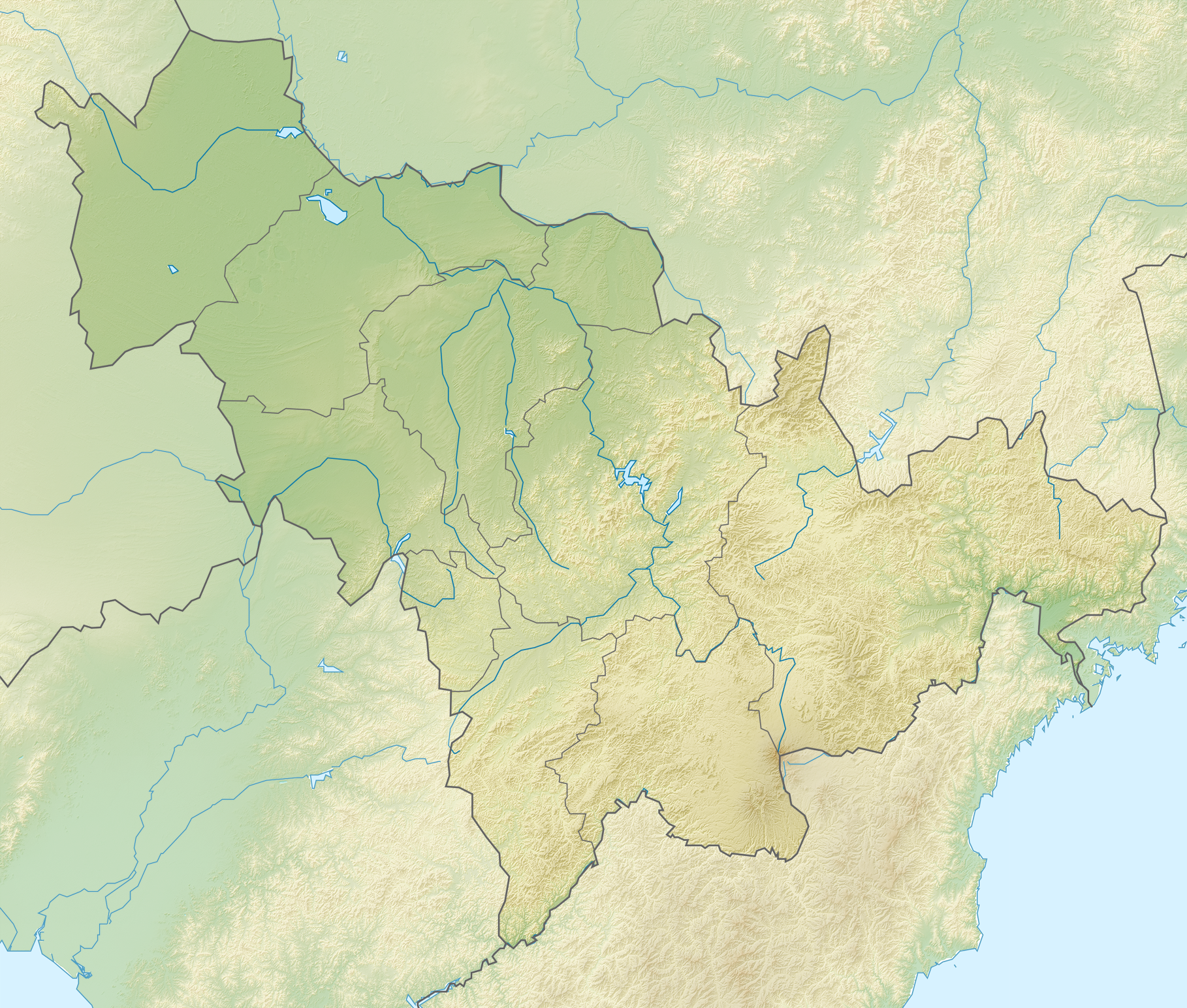
- Location within Jilin
- Location: Jilin
- Coordinates: 42°50′N 130°44′E
- Area: 1,087 km^{2} (420 sq mi)
- Established: 2001

Hunchun National Nature Reserve is a protected area in the Changbai Mountains in northeastern China's Jilin Province. It was established in December 2001 and covers 1,087 km^{2} (420 sq mi) of deciduous and coniferous forests. Wildlife recorded in the reserve include Siberian tiger, Amur leopard, sika deer, roe deer, red deer and wild boar.
