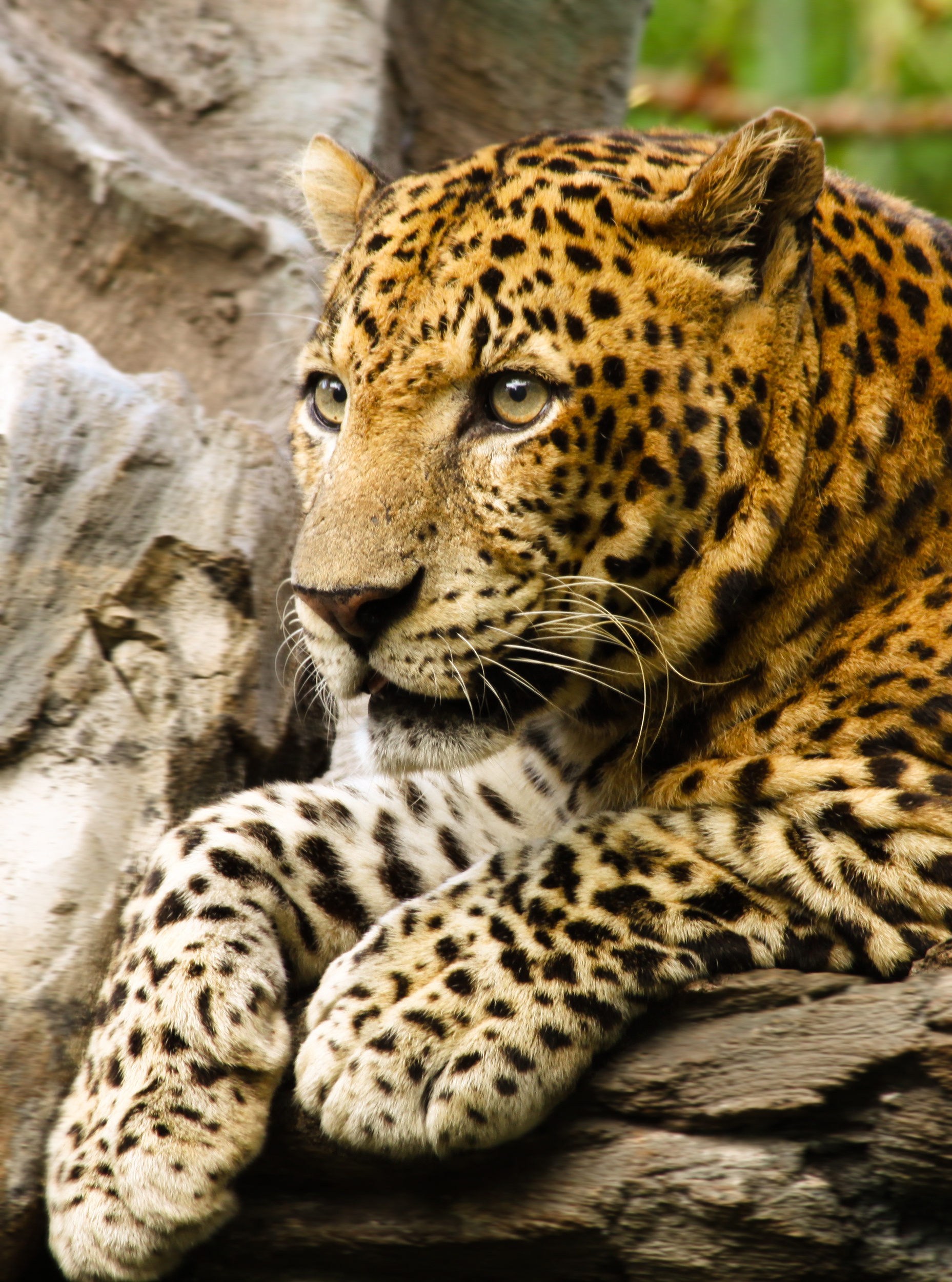
- Javan leopard in a safari park in Bali, Indonesia

Conservation status
- Endangered (IUCN 3.1)

Scientific classification
- Kingdom: Animalia
- Phylum: Chordata
- Class: Mammalia
- Infraclass: Placentalia
- Order: Carnivora
- Family: Felidae
- Genus: Panthera
- Species: P. pardus
- Subspecies: P. p. melas

Trinomial name
- Panthera pardus melas (G. Cuvier, 1809)
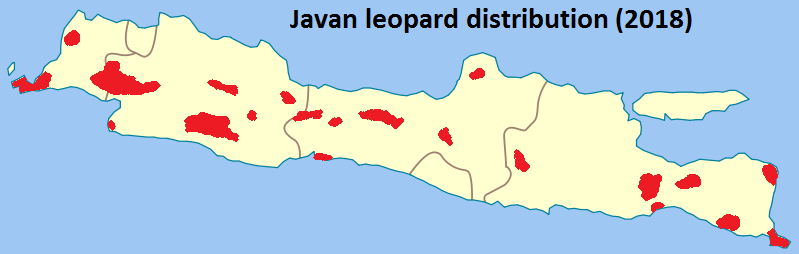
- Distribution of the Javan leopard in red

= Javan leopard =

Subspecies of leopard

The Javan leopard (Panthera pardus melas) is a leopard subspecies confined to the Indonesian island of Java. It has been listed as Endangered on the IUCN Red List since 2021. The population is estimated at 188–571 mature individuals in 22 fragmented subpopulations and a declining population trend. The total remaining habitat is estimated at only 2,267.9 to 3,277.3 km^{2} (875.6 to 1,265.4 sq mi).

== Characteristics ==
The Javan leopard was initially described as a black panther with dark black spots and silver-gray eyes. It has either a normal spotted coat with rosettes or a recessive phenotype resulting in a black coat.

== Evolution ==
Morphological research indicates that the Javan leopard is craniometrically distinct from other Asian leopard subspecies, and is a distinct taxon that split off from other Asian leopard subspecies in the Middle Pleistocene about 800,000 years ago. In the Middle Pleistocene, it may have migrated to Java from South Asia across a land bridge that bypassed Sumatra and Borneo.

== Distribution and habitat ==
The Javan leopard is confined to the Indonesian island of Java. It is known to inhabit Gunung Halimun National Park, Ujung Kulon National Park, Gunung Gede Pangrango National Park, Ceremai National Park, Merbabu National Park, Merapi National Park, Bromo Tengger Semeru National Park, Meru Betiri National Park, Ijen Mountain, Baluran National Park and Alas Purwo National Park. It inhabits elevations from sea level to 2,540 m (8,330 ft) ranging from dense tropical rainforest to dry deciduous forests. Outside protected areas, it was recorded in secondary forest, mixed agriculture and production forest between 2008 and 2014.

In the 1990s, it survived in the seral stages of successional vegetation patterns, which made it less susceptible to humans' disruptive activities than many other mammals.

From 2001 to 2004, monitoring research was conducted in a 20 km^{2} (7.7 sq mi) area of Gunung Halimun National Park using camera traps and radio tracking. Seven leopards were identified in the study area. The total population was estimated at 42 to 58 individuals. The home range of an adult female averaged 9.82 km^{2} (3.79 sq mi).

== Ecology and behavior ==
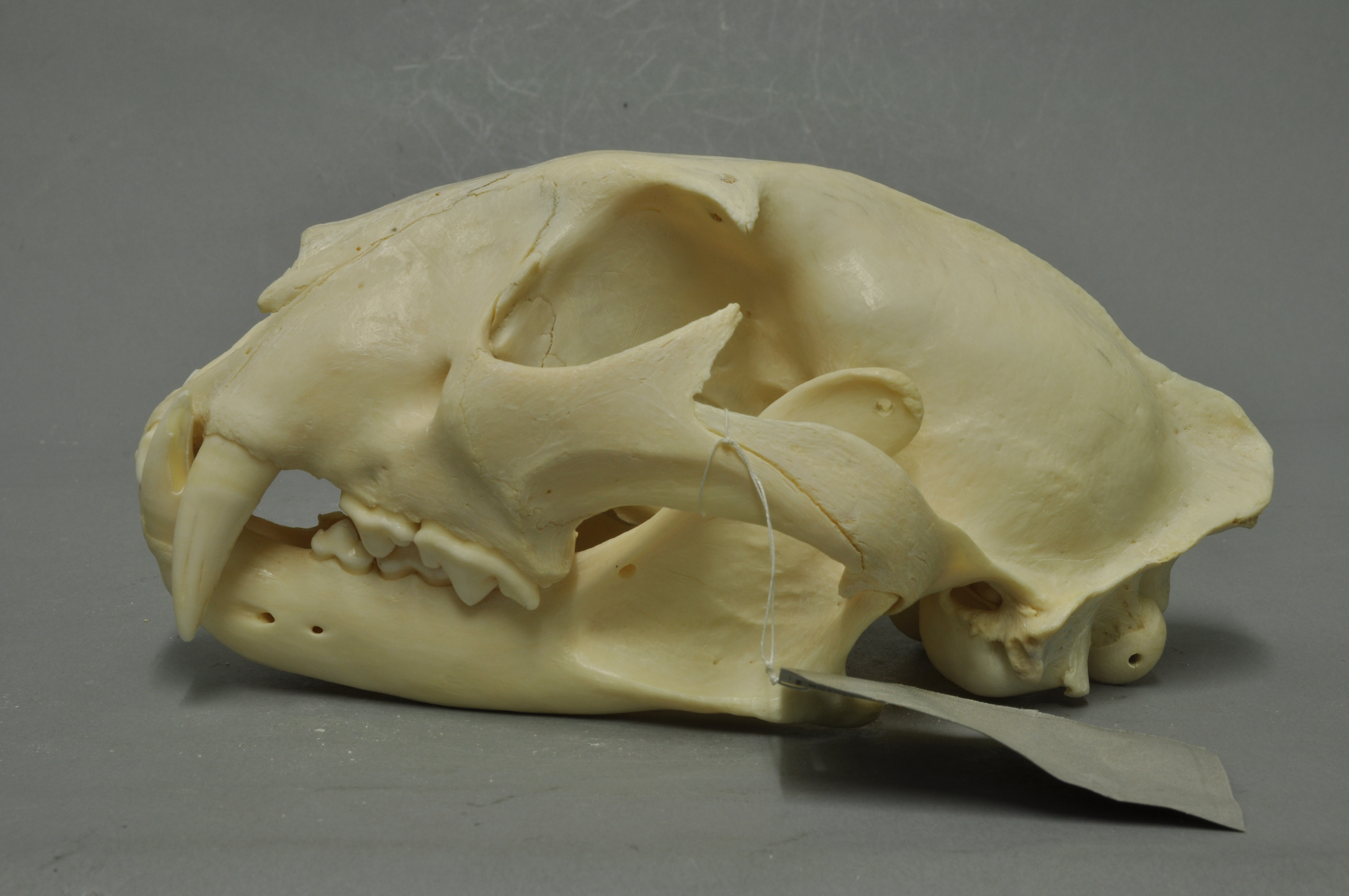
Skull of a Javan leopard

The Javan leopard's prey comprises barking deer, wild boar, Java mouse-deer, and primates such as crab-eating macaque, silvery lutung and Javan gibbon. Javan leopards also look for food in close by villages and have been known to prey on domestic dogs, chickens and goats. Two leopards were radio-collared in the Gunung Halimun National Park. Their daily activity pattern showed peaks in the early mornings between 6:00 and 9:00, and late afternoons between 15:00 and 18:00.

== Threats ==
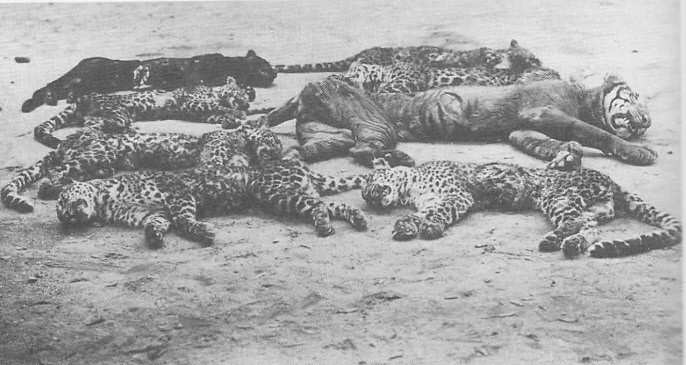
Seven Javan leopards and one Javan tiger killed during Rampokan, circa 1900.

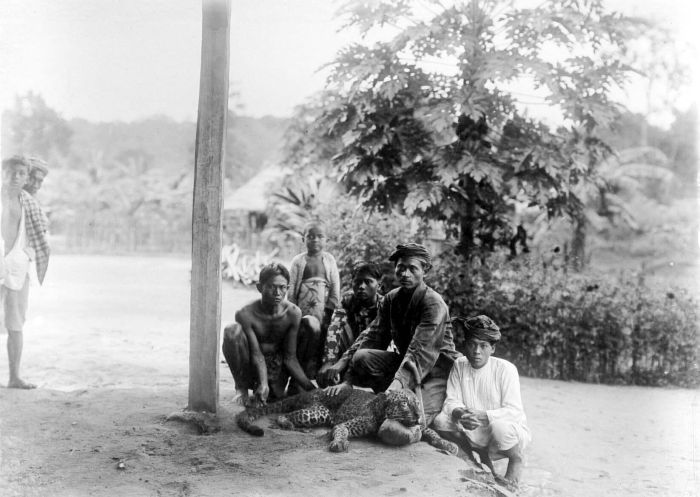
Men and a child with a newly shot leopard in Banten, West Java, circa 1915–1926.

The Javan leopard is threatened by loss of habitat, prey base depletion, and poaching due to human population growth and agricultural expansion. Conflict between local people and leopards is also considered to be a main threat to the Javan leopard. Java has lost more than 90% of its natural vegetation and is one of the most densely populated islands in the world. Primary forests remain only in the mountainous regions at elevations above 1,400 m (4,600 ft).

== Conservation ==
The Javan leopard is listed in the CITES Appendix I. Efforts are being made to restore the Javan leopard population and prevent its extinction. Hunting laws are strictly enforced. In 2005, Gunung Halimun National Park was enlarged to three times its original size for the protection of the Javan leopard, silvery gibbon (Hylobates moloch) and Javan hawk-eagle (Nisaetus bartelsi).

=== In captivity ===
In 1997, 14 Javan leopards were kept in European zoos. The Javan leopard is not specifically managed in captive breeding programs in Europe and America. As of 2007, the Taman Safari Zoo in Bogor, Indonesia, kept 17 Javan leopards, seven males and 10 females, of which four were breeding pairs. The Indonesian zoos of Ragunan, Taman Safari, and Surabaya Zoo also keep Javan leopards. As of December 2011, two male and one female Javan leopard were kept in Tierpark Berlin, Germany; and one male and one female in Ragunan Zoo. In 2013, one male Javan leopard was transferred from Tierpark Berlin to the Prague Zoo.

Javan leopards are also kept at the Cikananga Wildlife Rescue Center in a special enclosure until they can be released back into the wild. In 2017, a young male Javan Leopard arrived at the Cikananga Wildlife Center, being a victim of animal-human conflict. This individual required intensive medical care and recovered well. In May 2023, it was released at Mount Halimun-Salak National Park under the coordination of MoeF (KKHSG), BBKSDA West Java, and Mount Halimun-Salak National Park.

== See also ==
- Indian leopard
- Amur leopard
- Panthera pardus tulliana
- Indochinese leopard
- Sri Lankan leopard
- African leopard
- Zanzibar leopard
- Chinese leopard
- Panthera pardus spelaea
