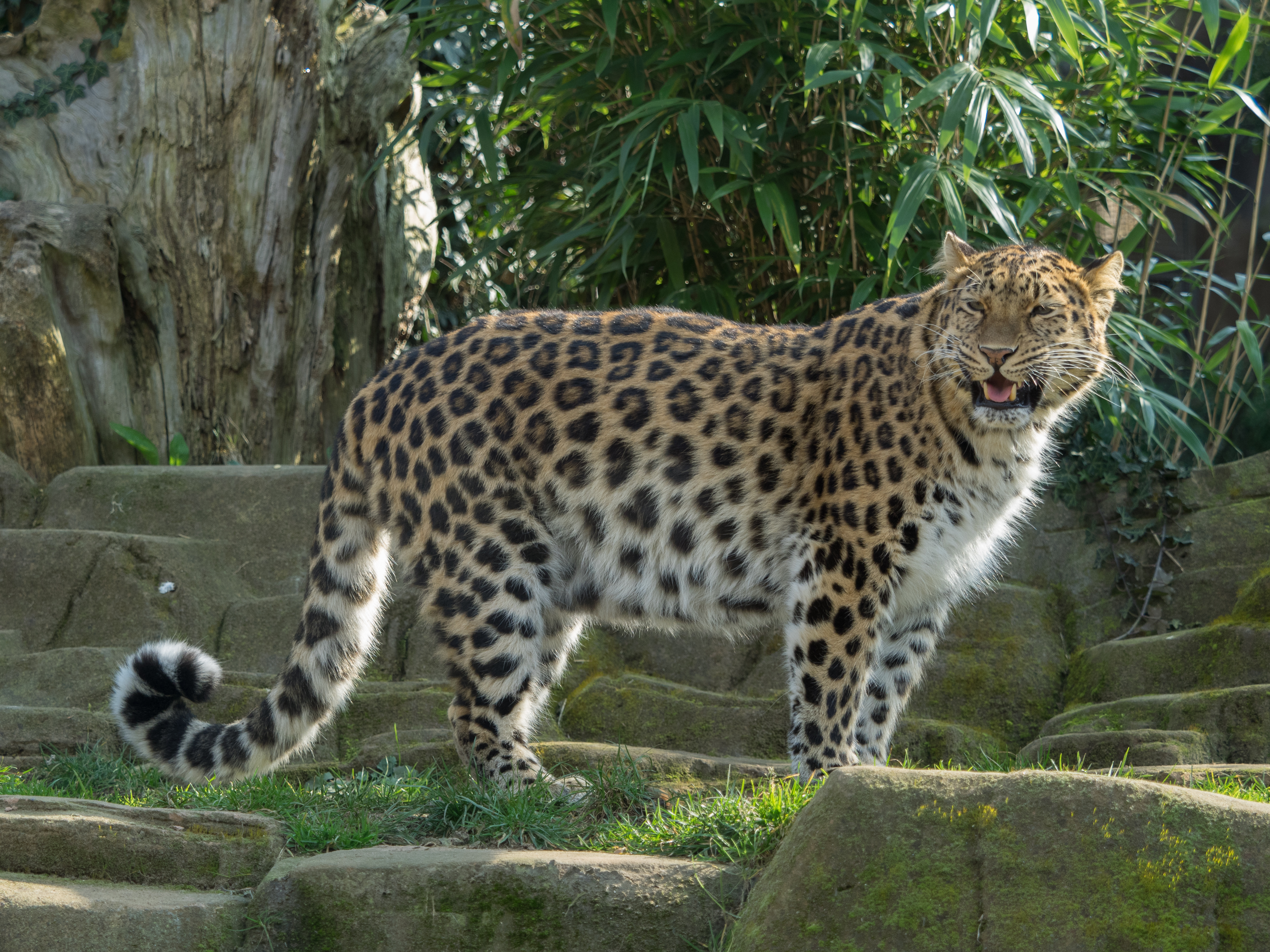
- A captive Amur leopard at the Colchester Zoo, England

Conservation status
- Critically Endangered (IUCN 3.1)

Scientific classification
- Kingdom: Animalia
- Phylum: Chordata
- Class: Mammalia
- Order: Carnivora
- Family: Felidae
- Genus: Panthera
- Species: P. pardus
- Subspecies: P. p. orientalis

Trinomial name
- Panthera pardus orientalis (Schlegel, 1857)
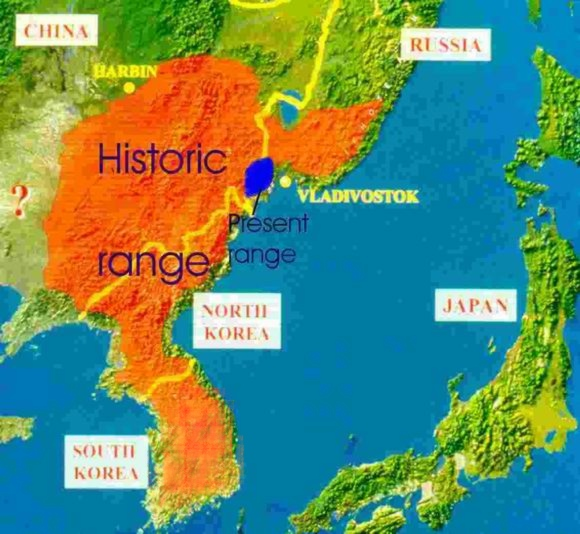
- Historic and present distribution of the subspecies (excluding northern China to the west of Manchuria)

Synonyms
- P. p. japonensis? (Gray, 1862); Felis villosa; Panthera hanensis

= Amur leopard =

Subspecies of large cat

The Amur leopard (Panthera pardus orientalis) is a leopard subspecies native to the Primorye region of southeastern Russia and northern China. It is listed as Critically Endangered on the IUCN Red List, as in 2007, only 19–26 wild leopards were estimated to survive in southeastern Russia and northeastern China.

As of 2015, fewer than 60 individuals were estimated to survive in Russia and China. Camera-trapping surveys conducted between 2014 and 2015 revealed 92 individuals in an 8,398 km^{2} (3,242 sq mi) large transboundary area along the Russian-Chinese border. As of 2023, the population was thought to comprise 128–130 sub-adult and adult individuals.

Results of genetic research indicate that the Amur leopard is genetically close to leopards in northern China and Korea, suggesting that the leopard population in this region became fragmented in the early 20th century. The North Chinese leopard was formerly recognized as a distinct subspecies (P. p. japonensis), but was subsumed under the Amur leopard in 2017.

== Naming and etymology ==
The names 'Amurland leopard' and 'Amur leopard' were coined by Pocock in 1930, when he compared leopard specimens in the collection of the Natural History Museum, London. In particular, he referred to a leopard skin from the Amur Bay as 'Amur leopard'. Since at least 1985, this name has been used for the leopard subspecies in eastern Siberia and for the captive population in zoos worldwide.

The Amur leopard is also known as the "Siberian leopard", "Far Eastern leopard", and "Korean leopard".

== Taxonomic history ==
In 1857, Hermann Schlegel described a leopard skin from Korea under the scientific name Felis orientalis. Since Schlegel's description, several naturalists and curators of natural history museums described zoological specimens of leopards from the Russian Far East and China:

- Leopardus japonensis described and proposed in 1862 by John Edward Gray was a tanned leopard skin received by the British Museum.
- Leopardus chinensis proposed by Gray in 1867 was a leopard skull from the mountains northwest of Peking.
- Felis fontanierii proposed by Alphonse Milne-Edwards in 1867 was a leopard skin from the vicinity of Peking.
- Felis ingrami was a leopard skin from Kweichow in central China, and Felis villosa a leopard skin from the Amur Bay, both proposed by J. Lewis Bonhote in 1903.
- Felis [Leopardus] grayi proposed in 1904 by Édouard Louis Trouessart was a leopard fossil.
- Panthera hanensis proposed in 1908 by Paul Matschie was a leopard skin from Shaanxi province.
- Felis pardus sinensis proposed in 1911 by a German fur trader was a leopard skin from southern China.
- Panthera pardus bedfordi proposed in 1930 by Reginald Innes Pocock was a leopard skin from Shaanxi.

In 2017, the Cat Classification Task Force of the Cat Specialist Group subsumed P. p. japonensis to P. p. orientalis. The remaining synonyms are not considered valid subspecies. However, a 2024 study which performed phylogenetic analysis on the basis of cranial morphology and mitochondrial genome analysis suggested that P. p. japonensis is likely a distinct subspecies.

=== Genetic research ===
Phylogenetic analysis of leopard samples from Primorsky Krai and North Korea revealed that they cannot be distinguished. It is considered very probable that the Amur leopard metapopulation became fragmented less than a century ago. Phylogenetic analysis of an old leopard skin from South Korea revealed it to be an Amur leopard.

The complete mitochondrial genome of a wild male leopard specimen from Shaanxi province in central China has been amplified and is 16,966 base pairs long.

== Characteristics ==
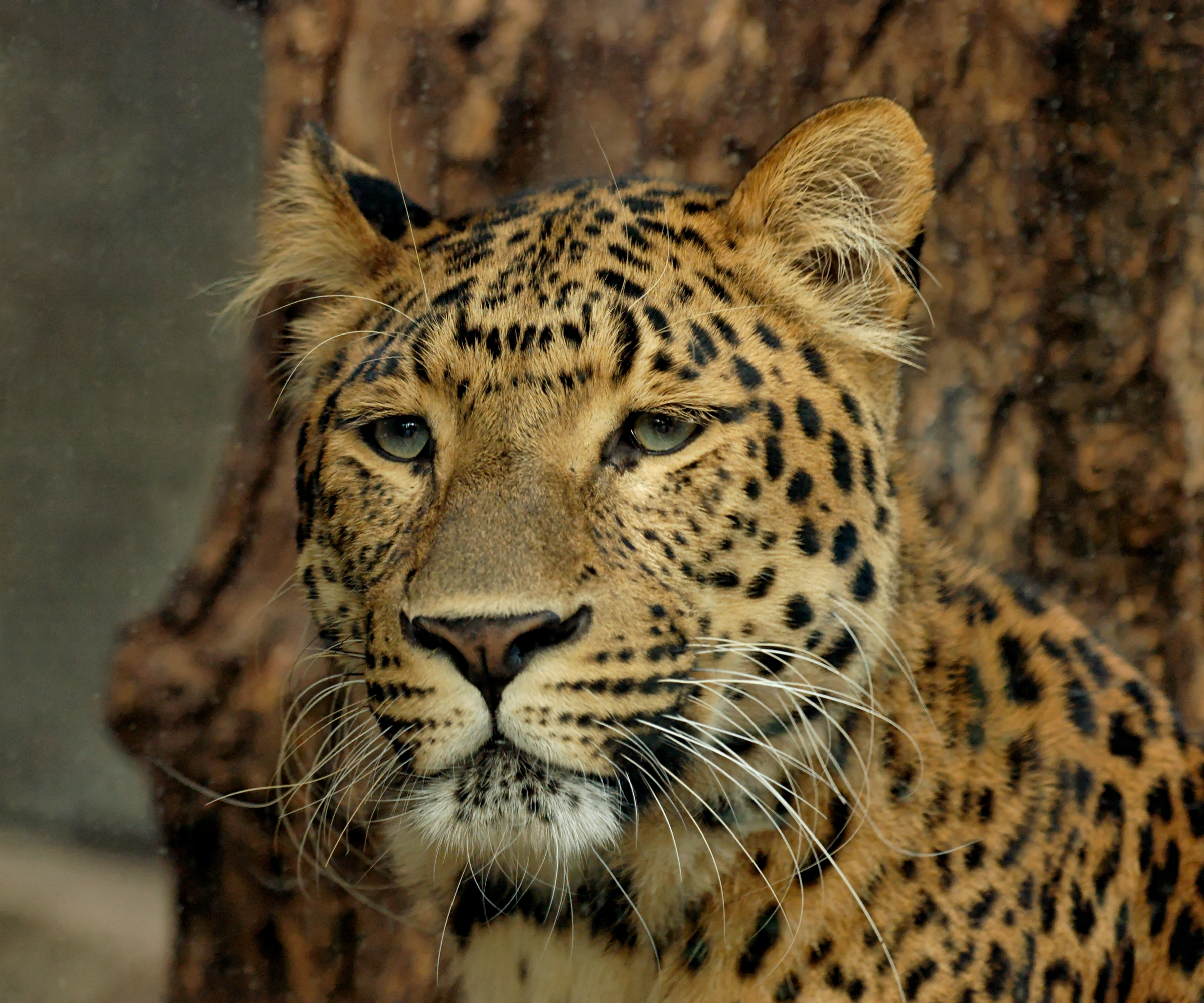
Close-up of a leopard at Ménagerie du Jardin des Plantes

The Amur leopard can easily be differentiated from other leopard subspecies by its thick, pale cream-coloured fur, particularly in winter. Rosettes on the flanks are 5 cm × 5 cm (2.0 in × 2.0 in) and widely spaced, up to 2.5 cm (0.98 in), with thick, unbroken rings and darkened centres. Its fur is fairly soft with long and dense hair. The length of hair on the back is 20–25 mm (0.79–0.98 in) in summer and up to 70 mm (2.8 in) in winter. The winter coat varies from fairly light yellow to dense yellowish-red with a golden tinge, or rusty-reddish-yellow. In summer, the fur is brighter, with more vivid colouration pattern. It is rather small in body size, with males larger than females. Males measure 107–136 cm (42–54 in) with an 82–90 cm (32–35 in) long tail, a shoulder height of 64–78 cm (25–31 in), and a weight of 32.2–48 kg (71–106 lb). Females weigh 25–42.5 kg (55–94 lb).

The North Chinese leopard was first described on the basis of a single tanned skin which was fulvous above, and pale beneath, with large, roundish, oblong black spots on the back and limbs, and small black spots on the head. The spots on the back, shoulders and sides formed a ring around a central fulvous spot. The black spots on the nape were elongated, and large ones on the chest formed a necklace. The tail was spotted and had four black rings at the tip.

== Distribution and habitat ==
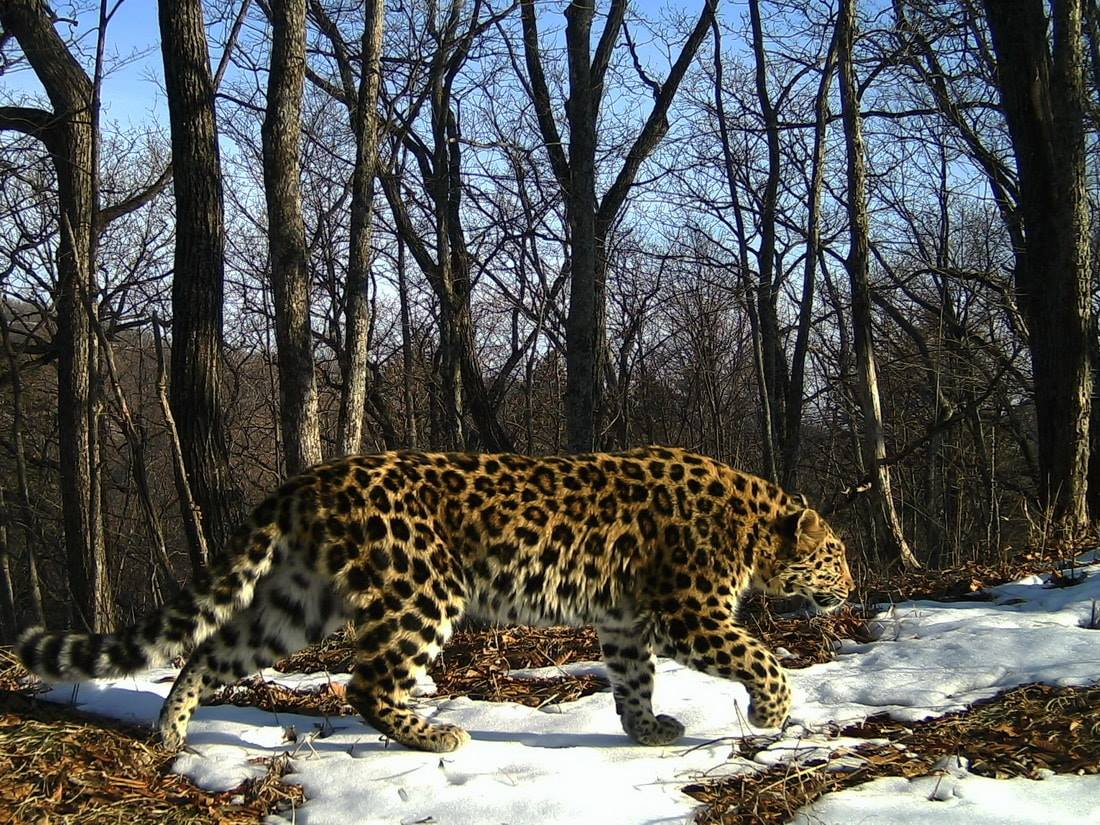
Amur leopard. Frame from a camera trap

In the Russian Far East, the Amur leopard currently inhabits an area of about 7,000 km^{2} (2,700 sq mi). It is well adapted to the cold climate and heavy snowfall of the region. The association of the leopard with mountainous areas (and snow-free south-facing rocky slopes in winter) has been recorded. It is usually confined to places where wild sika deer (Cervus nippon) live, or where deer husbandry is practised. Leopards cross between Russia, China, and possibly North Korea across the Tumen River, despite a high and long wire fence marking the boundary.

The first camera trap image of an Amur leopard in northeastern China was taken in 2010 in Hunchun National Nature Reserve, in the Changbai Mountains of Jilin and Heilongjiang Provinces. This habitat consists of broadleaved and conifer forests at elevations of 600–1,200 m (2,000–3,900 ft), where the annual average temperature is about 1.5 °C (34.7 °F). In this area, leopards were repeatedly photographed by camera traps set up between January 2013 and July 2014 covering up to 4,858 km^{2} (1,876 sq mi).

Elsewhere in China, Amur leopard distribution is fragmented, with small populations occurring foremost in isolated reserves. In Shanxi Province, leopards were recorded in 16 protected areas and six nature reserves (including Foping National Nature Reserve) during camera trapping surveys between 2007 and 2014.

=== Historical range ===
Historical records indicate that the Amur leopard occurred throughout eastern Siberia, northeastern China including near Beijing, the mountains to Beijing's northwest, as well as across Manchuria and the Korean Peninsula. Amur leopards entered the city of Seoul in the late 19th century. They were hunted on the Korean Peninsula for their skins and were extensively persecuted during Japanese rule. At least 624 leopards were killed during the Japanese occupation between 1910 and 1945. In South Korea, the last known leopard was captured in 1970. The Amur leopard is considered locally extinct in South Korea, and likewise probably in North Korea as well. Some researchers have proposed that some of North Korea's more isolated, remote regions may yet still provide ideal leopard habitat, with ample prey sources and dense, quiet woodlands, free of competition from tigers.

In Russia, the Amur leopard's native range was dramatically reduced during the 1970s to about 20% of the original land. Its northernmost range boundary commenced on the coast of the Sea of Japan at 44°N, continuing south at a distance of 15–30 km (9.3–18.6 mi) from the coast to 43°10'N. There, their range turned sharply westward and north of the Suchan River basin, continuing north to encompass the source of the Ussuri River and two of its right-bank tributaries toward the bank of Khanka Lake. In the 1950s, leopards were observed about 50 km (31 mi) north of Vladivostok city and in Kedrovaya Pad Nature Reserve.

In China, Amur leopards historically occurred in the Lesser Khingan, Changbai and Wanda Mountains until the 1970s. In the following decades, the range decreased to a few areas in Jilin and Heilongjiang Provinces. Today, only small and isolated populations remain in northern China, specifically in Jilin.

== Ecology and behaviour ==
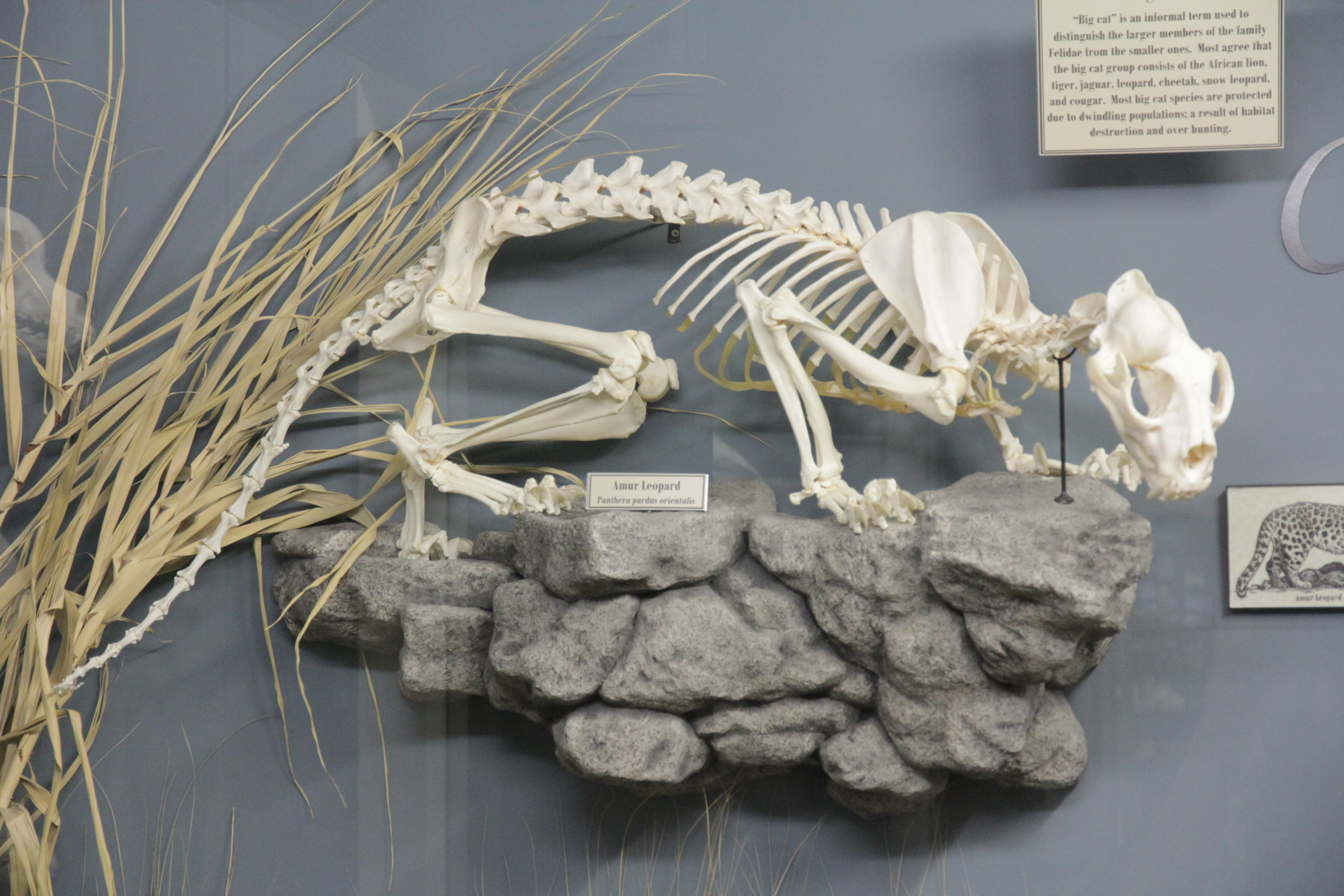
Skeleton at the Museum of Osteology

Like other leopard subspecies, Amur leopards are solitary, unless females have offspring. Records from camera-traps indicate that they are more diurnal (active during the day) than nocturnal, as well as crepuscular (active during dawn and dusk) during both the summer and winter seasons. This activity pattern coincides with activity periods of prey species such as Siberian roe deer (Capreolus pygargus), Manchurian sika deer (Cervus nippon mantchuricus) and Ussuri wild boar (Sus scrofa ussuricus).

Amur leopards are extremely conservative in their choice of territory. An individual's territory is usually located in a river basin which generally extends to the natural topographical borders of the area. The territory of two individuals overlaps sometimes, but only slightly. Depending on sex, age and family size, the size of an individual's territory varies from 5,000–30,000 ha (19–116 sq mi). Individuals use the same hunting trails, migration routes and even rest places over the course of many years. Leopards are resident at places where wild animals are abundant, and follow herds of ungulates. In the Ussuri region, their main prey are Siberian roe deer, Manchurian sika deer, Manchurian wapiti (Cervus canadensis xanthopygus), Siberian musk deer (Moschus moschiferus), Amur elk (Alces alces cameloides) and Ussuri wild boar. They also catch hares (Lepus sp.), Asian badgers (Meles leucurus), fowl, and mice. In Kedrovaya Pad Nature Reserve, roe deer is their main prey year-round, but they also prey on young Asian black bear (Ursus thibetanus) cubs under two years old. When density of ungulates is low, leopards have large home ranges of up to 100 km^{2} (39 sq mi).

During a study of radio-collared Amur leopards in the early 1990s, a territorial dispute between two males at a deer farm was documented, suggesting that Amur leopards favour such farms for hunting. Female leopards with cubs are often found in the proximity of deer farms. The large number of domesticated deer on the farms is a reliable food source in difficult times.

=== Reproduction ===
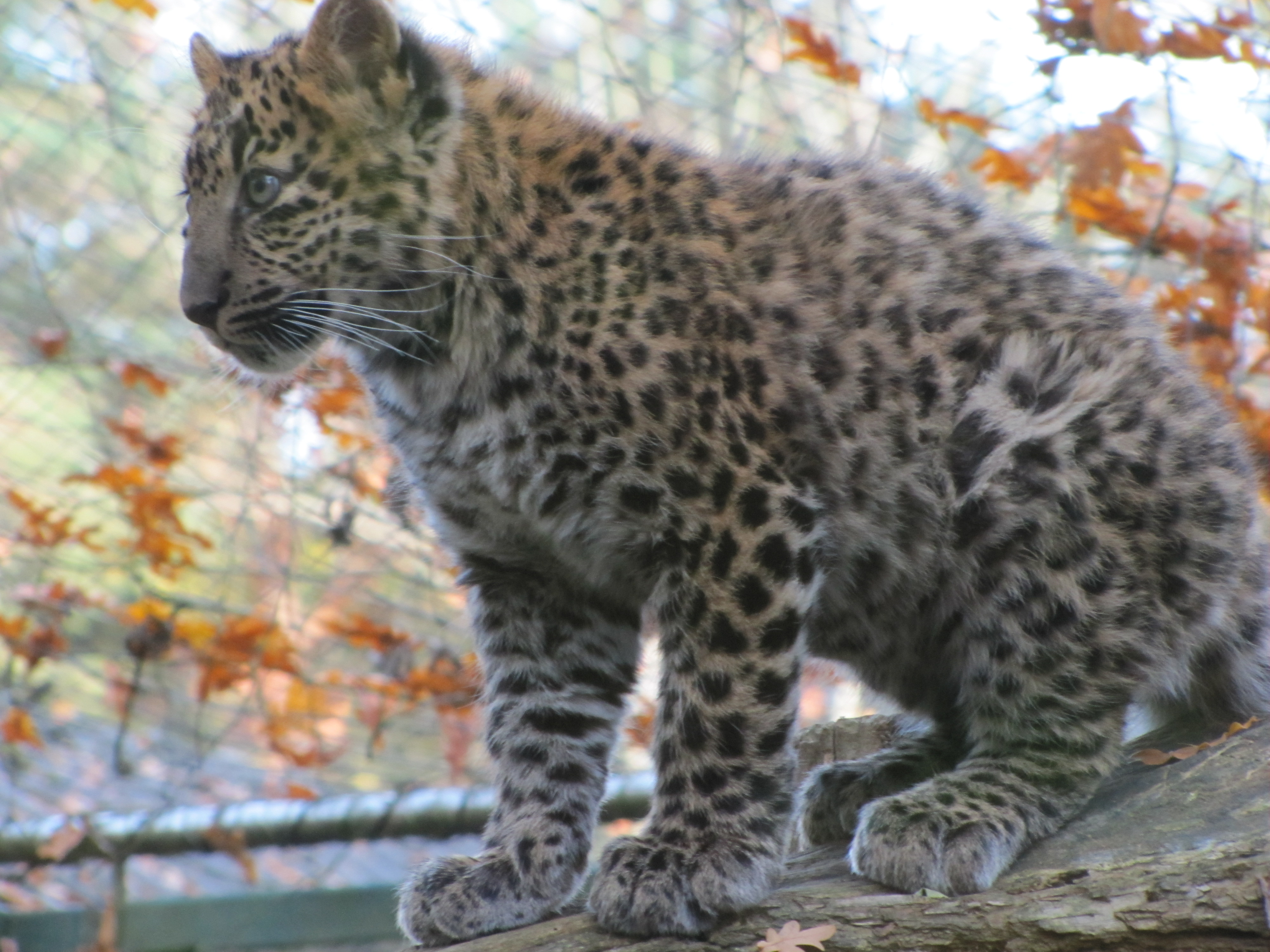
Cub in Cottbus Zoo

An adult leopard grooming a cub

Amur leopards become sexually mature at the age of 2–3 years. They are able to reproduce up to 10–15 years of age. Estrus lasts 12–18 days, and in exceptional cases up to 25 days. Gestation lasts 90–105 days, and usually between 92 and 95 days. A newborn cub weighs 500–700 g (18–25 oz). The young open their eyes on the 7th–10th day and begin to crawl on the 12th–15th day. By the second month they emerge from their dens and also begin to eat meat. Cubs are weaned when three months old, and then learn to hunt. Lactation continues for five or six months. Cubs reach independence at the approximate age of two to three years. They stay with their mother until they are around 18 months to two years old. Juveniles sometimes stay with their mother until she comes into estrus again. Until the 1970s, cubs were seen in Kedrovaya Pad Nature Reserve and in northeastern China most often between the end of March and May. Litters comprised two to three cubs. In captivity some individuals have lived for 21 years. In 2011, an adult Amur leopard female was radio-collared in the vicinity of the Land of the Leopard National Park in the Khasansky District of Primorskyi Krai. During three years of tracking, she used a home range of 161.7 km^{2} (62.4 sq mi) with a core area of 23.3 km^{2} (9.0 sq mi). During estrus, she moved in a core area of 52.9 km^{2} (20.4 sq mi). After giving birth in late June, she reduced her movements to an area of about 3 km^{2} (1.2 sq mi) for a month, in which she shifted her cubs three times. From autumn onwards, she gradually increased her home range. When the cubs were more than one year old, the family moved together in the initial home range of 161.7 km^{2} (62.4 sq mi).

During a population census in 1997, four females found with young had only one cub each. Results of radio telemetry studies confirmed that young stay with their mother for two years. In Kedrovaya Pad Nature Reserve, the young of two different litters were observed with their mothers at the same time.

== Threats ==
The Amur leopard is threatened by poaching of both individuals and prey species, habitat loss and deforestation. Its natural habitat is threatened by forest fires and construction of new roads. Due to the small number of reproducing Amur leopards in the wild, the gene pool has such low genetic diversity that the population is at risk from inbreeding depression. In 2015, a wild Amur leopard was found with canine distemper virus in Primorskyi Krai. Due to the small population, all wild individuals could possibly be exposed to domestic or wild disease carriers and transmitters in the future.

Amur leopards are sympatric with Siberian tigers (Panthera tigris tigris) in some areas; in the Changbai Mountains, leopards have been recorded at higher altitudes and further distances from settlements and roads than tigers. Tigers can kill leopards if densities of large and medium-sized prey species are low. Competition between these predators supposedly decreases in summer, when small prey species are more available. In winter, conditions are less favorable for tigers, which most likely causes the trophic niche overlap with leopards to peak.

Amur leopards are also sympatric with Ussuri brown bears (Ursus arctos lasiotus), but no interactions between the two species have been recorded.

=== Poaching ===
Poaching of Amur leopards is the main threat to their survival. Despite evidence of Chinese traders illegally buying leopard skins from Russia, no skins were confiscated at borders to China until 2002 and 2003, where over seven skins or part of skins were confiscated (six in Russia and one in China) over a period of 14 months. Leopards are most often killed by local Russians from small villages in and around the leopard's habitat. These villagers hunt entirely illegally; they have no licenses for hunting or their guns, are not members of one of the local hunting leases, and hunt Amur leopards (a protected species under Russian law). In 1999, skins of poached leopards were offered for $500–1,000 near a protected area in Russia.

=== Forest degradation ===
Human-induced fires are another main threat to the survival of the Amur leopard. Setting fire to fields is a habit of rural farmers who start them for a particular purpose, such as improving fertility for livestock grazing, killing ticks and other insects, making scrap metals visible so that they can be easily collected, culling vegetation along train tracks, and stimulating fern growth. Young ferns are sold in shops, served in restaurants and also exported to China as a popular dish. Surveys using satellite images and GIS techniques revealed that on average, 19% of south-west Primorye burns annually, and a total of 46% burned at least once in six years. Due to a long and frequent fire history, much of the land in south-west Primorye has been converted from coniferous forests (suitable leopard habitat) to open "savannah" landscapes with grass, oak bushes and isolated trees that leopards seem to avoid (most likely due to low ungulate densities).

In the 20th century, large deer farms were built over thousands of hectares of leopard habitat; the velvet of deer antlers was sold to Asian pharmacies. However, the number of deer farms has decreased considerably since the late 1990s.

=== Development projects ===
A number of plans for economic activities in south-west Primorye were developed that posed a serious threat to the Amur leopard's survival. A plan to build an oil pipeline from central Siberia through Primorye to the coast of the Sea of Japan was shelved; another plan for an open pit coal mine in the heart of the Amur leopard's range was not carried out following pressure from environmentalists and the Ministry of Natural Resources. The strategic location of south-west Primorye (being close to the main population centres of Primorsky Krai, the Sea of Japan and the borders with North Korea and China) makes it more attractive for economic activities, including transport, industries, tourism and development of infrastructure. The activity of logging itself is not a major threat; however, the use of road networks established for the transport of logs from forests increases anthropogenic pressures in unprotected leopard habitat.

=== Inbreeding ===
An acute problem is potential inbreeding. The remaining population could disappear as a result of genetic degeneration, even without direct human influence. The levels of diversity are remarkably low, indicative of a history of inbreeding in the population for several generations, or a population bottleneck. Such levels of genetic reduction have been associated with severe reproductive and congenital abnormalities that impede the health, survival and reproduction of some (but not all) genetically diminished small populations. Cub survival has declined over time, from 1.9 cubs per one female in 1973 to 1.7 in 1984, and 1.0 in 1991. Besides a decline in natural replacement, there is a high probability of mortality for all age groups, as a result of certain diseases or direct human impact.

== Conservation ==
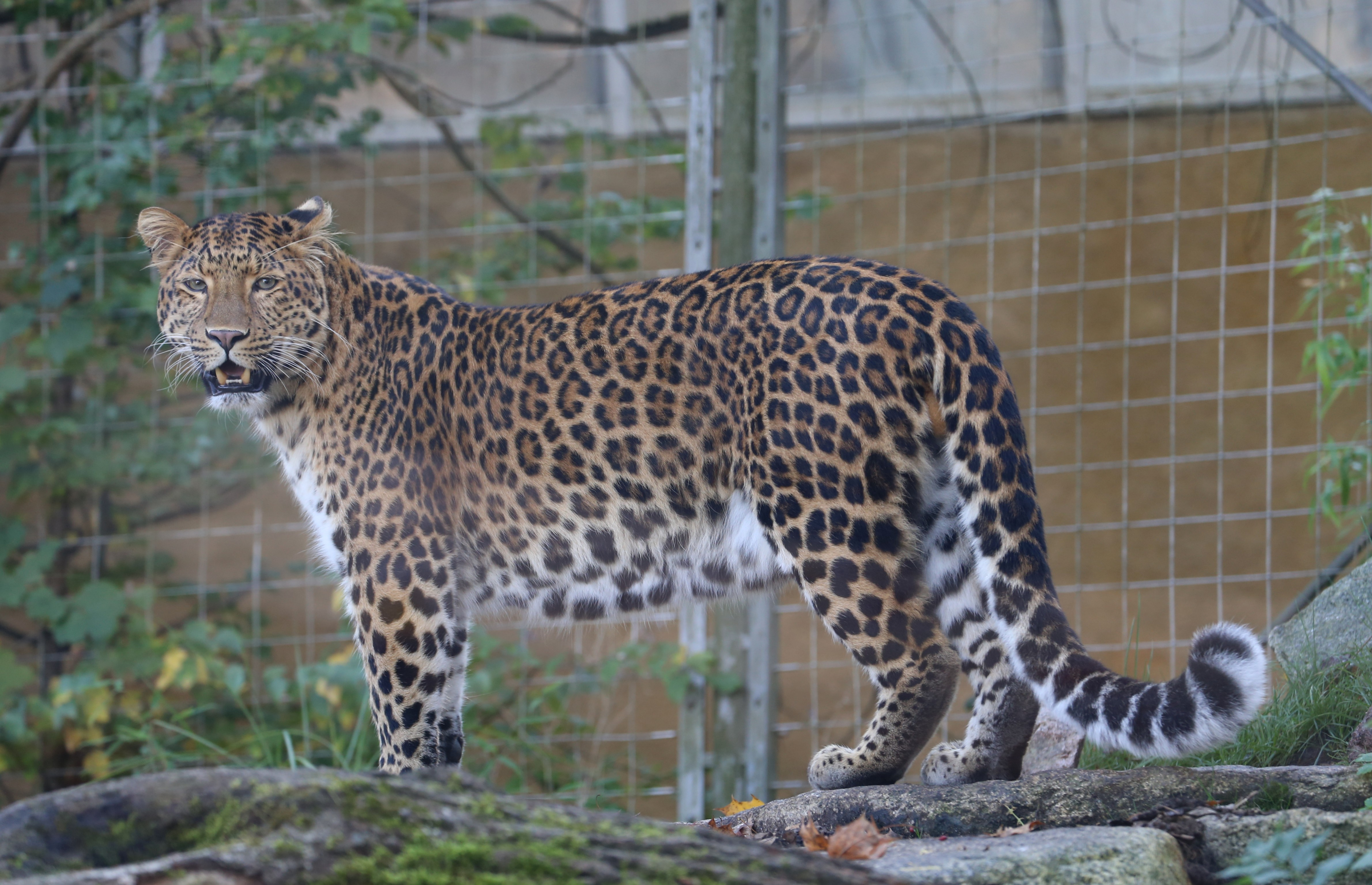
In Tierpark Hellabrunn

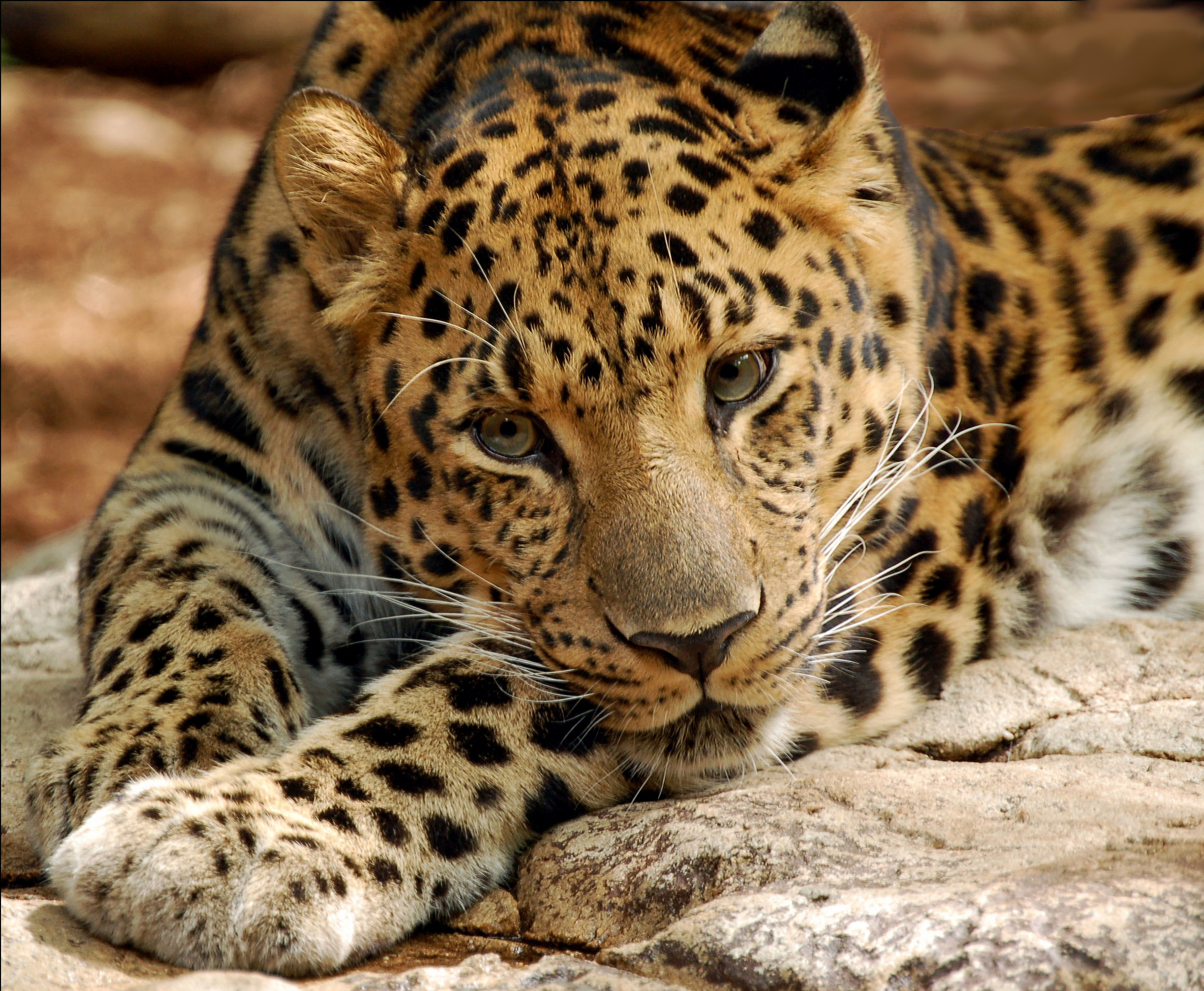
At Audubon Zoo

The Amur leopard is listed in CITES Appendix I. It is stated to need better protection from illegal trade in skins and bones.

In 2001, a meeting was held in Vladivostok with the aim of devising and planning management recommendations and activities needed to ensure the recovery and continued survival of the wild Amur leopard population in range countries. Chinese participants announced the creation of a new protected area in Jilin Province, the Hunchun Nature Reserve. Since 2014, Russian and Chinese biologists collaborate in transboundary monitoring of the Amur leopard population.

The Amur Leopard and Tiger Alliance (ALTA) is an initiative of Russian and western conservation organizations to conserve the Amur leopard and tiger, and secure a future for both species in the Russian Far East and Northeast China. ALTA operates across Northeast Asia under the guiding principle that only cooperative, coordinated conservation actions from all interested parties can save these endangered subspecies/populations from extinction. ALTA works in close co-operation with local, regional, and federal government and non-government organizations to protect the region's biological wealth through conservation, sustainable development, and local community involvement. The Phoenix Fund and the Wildlife Conservation Society provide a local framework for implementing ALTA projects, working closely with many Russian and Chinese agencies. With regard to conservation of leopards, ALTA aims at retaining a leopard population of 35 adult females (100 total) in south-west Primorye and the Jilin-Heilongjiang border region; and creating a second population of 20 adult females (60 adults total) in the former range of the leopard. Conservation projects for the leopard include:

- four antipoaching teams with a total of 15 members in the leopard's range
- a special task force of local police and anti-poaching teams led by the Khasan prosecutor
- monitoring of the leopard population through snow track counts and camera trap counts
- monitoring and analysis of the impact of fires on leopard habitat and the effectiveness of firefighting
- habitat assessment with geographic information system (GIS) techniques: assessment of the role of habitat quality, land ownership, land use, protection status, settlements, deer farms, roads, and human settlements with use of monitoring data and satellite images
- development of land-use plans that take in account future needs of leopards
- support for protected areas in the leopard range
- compensation of livestock kills by leopards and tigers
- a comprehensive education program for school children and students in the leopard range
- support for hunting leases, and an ungulate recovery program
- media campaign to create awareness about the leopard's plight
- support and technical assistance for the new Hunchun Nature Reserve in China that borders on the leopard range in Russia

An oil pipeline planned to be built through leopard habitat was rerouted, following a campaign by conservationists.

=== Reintroduction into the wild ===
Since 1996, the idea of reintroducing leopards to the south of the Sikhote-Alin mountain range has been discussed by ALTA members. During a workshop in 2001, the outlines and principles of a plan for the development of a second population of the Amur leopard in the Russian Far East was prepared. For reintroduction to be successful, the reasons for leopards disappearing from the southern Sikhote-Alin in the middle of the 20th century needed to be studied. It was recommended to assess reasons for localized extinctions, obtain support of local people, increase prey in areas proposed for reintroduction, ensure that conditions exist conducive for reintroduction in the selected area, and ensure survival of the existing population. There are two sources of leopards for reintroduction: leopards born and raised in zoos and leopards raised in a special reintroduction centre passed through a rehabilitation program for life in the wild.

For successful reintroduction, it is clear that the design of the breeding and release centre (and the leopard management within it) must focus strongly on overcoming the difficulties imposed by the captive origin of the cats. Two necessary behaviours should be acquired prior to release: the hunting and killing of live natural prey, and avoidance of humans and tigers.

During a meeting with Vladimir Putin in March 2009, the Minister of Natural Resources of Russia reassured that the ministry is planning to reintroduce leopards into the area, as well as create suitable and safe habitat, he also stated the government had already allocated all required funds for the project.

Potential reintroduction sites (contiguous patches of preferred habitat) were identified in the southern Sikhote-Alin. Three patches of potential coastal habitat could harbour a population of approximately 72 adult leopards (exceeding the 50 individual minimum needed for a self-sustaining population).

=== In captivity ===
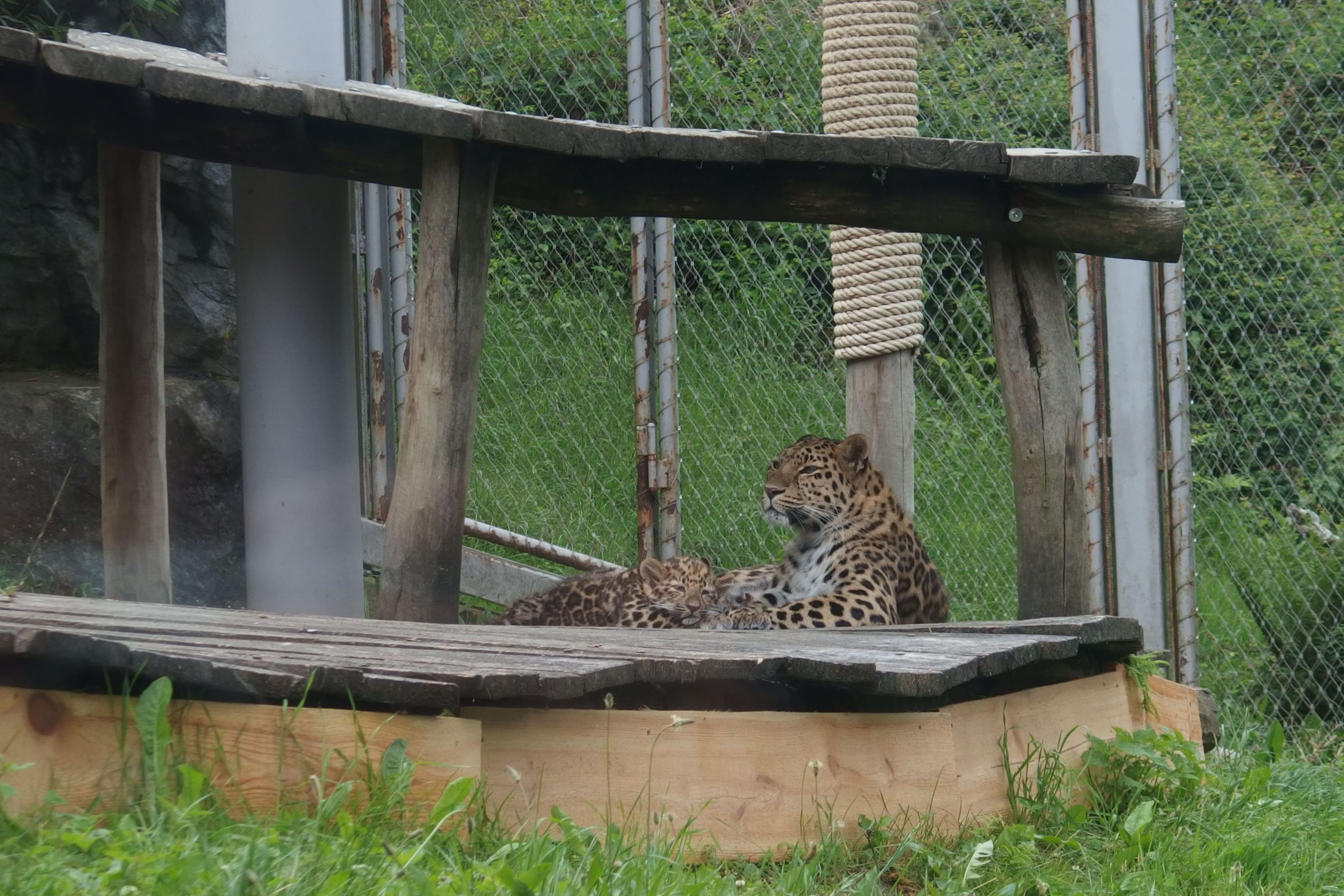
Female Zima with her cub in Olomouc Zoo in the Czech Republic

A captive breeding programme for the Amur leopard was established in 1961 from nine wild-born founders. A molecular genetic survey revealed that at least two founders of the captive pedigree had genetic information that is not consistent with any Amur leopards born in the wild. Both the American and European zoo populations include contribution of genes from a male founder that was a different leopard subspecies. It has been the strategy of the European Endangered Species Programme to minimize his contribution and maintain genetic diversity of the captive population.

As of December 2011, 173 captive Amur leopards were held in zoos worldwide. Within the EESP, 54 male, 40 female, and 7 unsexed individuals are kept. In American and Canadian zoos, another 31 males and 41 females are kept within the Population Management Program.

== In media ==
The Animal Planet documentary The Last Leopard (2008) is about the plight of Amur leopards in Russia. The television series "Wild Russia" showed a glimpse into the life of leopards. A female leopard and her cub were featured in two Planet Earth episodes.

== See also ==
- African leopard
- Indian leopard
- Panthera pardus tulliana
- Arabian leopard
- Indochinese leopard
- Javan leopard
- Sri Lankan leopard
- Zanzibar leopard
- Panthera pardus spelaea
