= Temperate rainforest =

Forests in the temperate zone

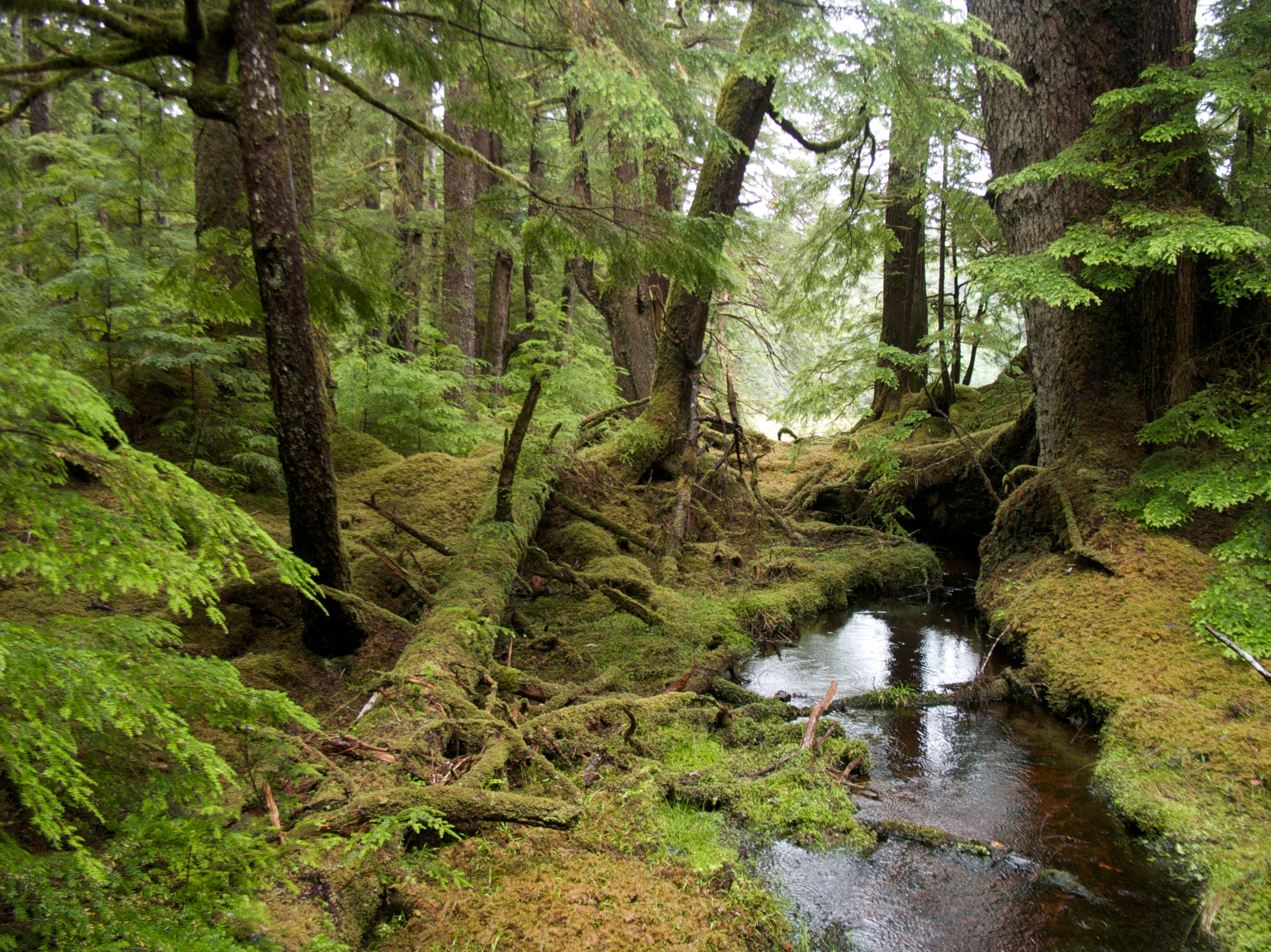
Western hemlock rainforest, Gwaii Haanas, Canada

Temperate rainforests are rainforests with coniferous or broadleaf forests that occur in the temperate zone and receive heavy rain.

Temperate rainforests occur in oceanic moist regions around the world: the Pacific temperate rainforests of the North American Pacific Northwest as well as the Appalachian temperate rainforest in the Appalachian region of the United States; the Valdivian temperate rainforests of southwestern South America; the rainforests of New Zealand and southeastern Australia; northwest Europe (small pockets in Great Britain and larger areas in Ireland, southern Norway, northern Iberia and Brittany); the Eastern North Korea continuum; Japan; the White Sea–Prince Caspian Sea region from the southeasternmost coastal zone of the Bulgarian coast, through Turkey, to Georgia, and northern Iran.

The moist conditions of temperate rainforests generally have an understory of mosses, ferns and some shrubs and berries. Temperate rainforests can be temperate coniferous forests or temperate broadleaf and mixed forests.

== Definition ==
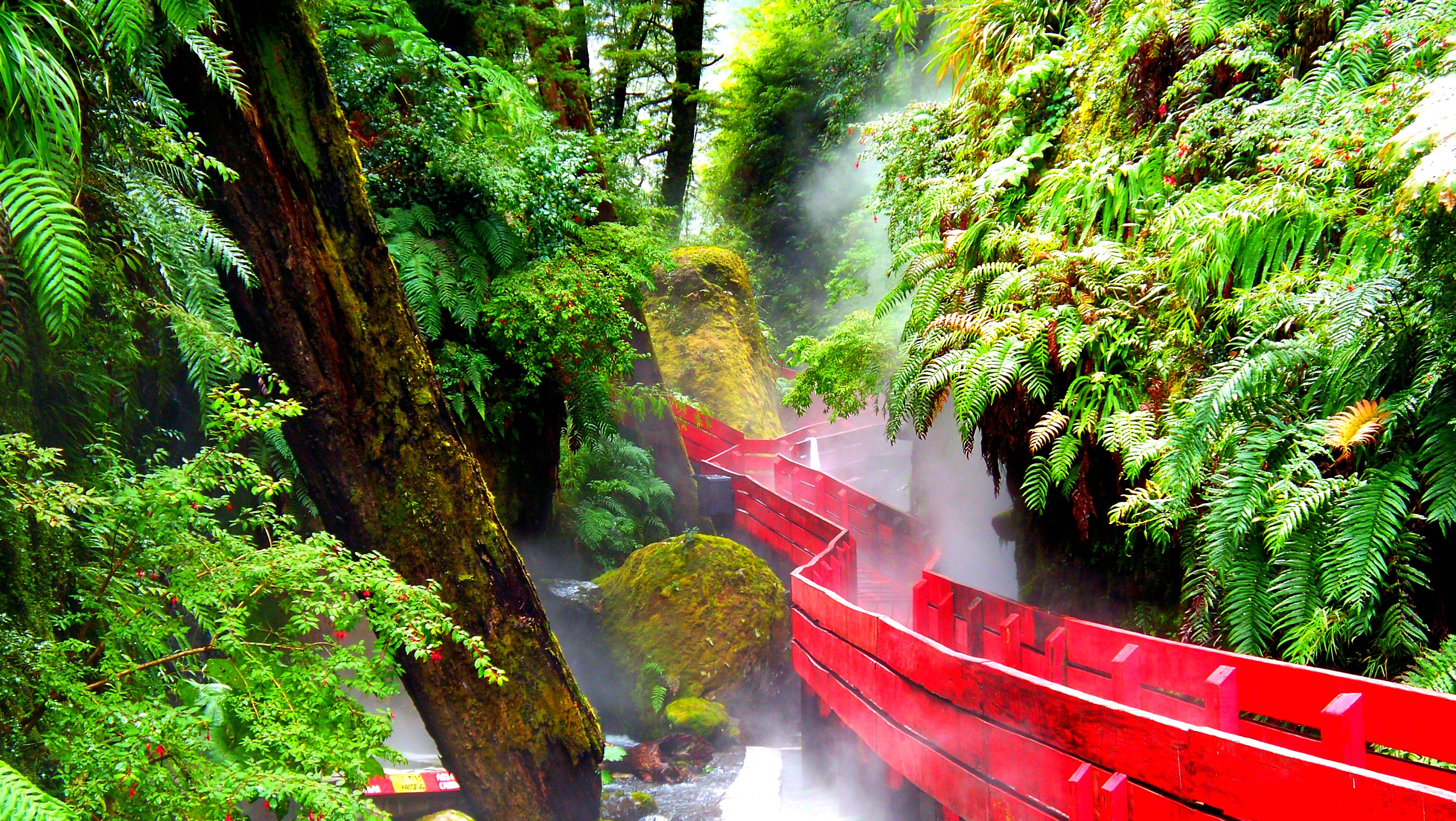
Humid temperate rainforest in Termas Geométricas near Coñaripe, Chile

For temperate wetforests of North America, Alaback's definition is widely recognized:

- Annual precipitation over 140 cm (55 in) (KJ)
- Mean annual temperature is between 4 and 12 °C (39 and 54 °F).

However, required annual precipitation depends on factors such as distribution of rain over the year, temperatures over the year and fog presence, and definitions in other regions of the world differ considerably. For example, Australian definitions are more ecological-structural rather than climatic:

- Closed canopy of trees excludes at least 69% of the sky.
- Forest is composed mainly of tree species which do not require fire for regeneration, but with seedlings able to regenerate under shade and in natural openings.

Australian definitions would exclude some temperate rainforests of western North America that are Coast Douglas-fir dominant, such as parts of the Klamath Mountains in southern Oregon and northern California, the Puget Lowlands of western Washington and the Georgia Depression in British Columbia, as their dominant tree species, the Coast Douglas-fir, requires stand-destroying disturbance to initiate a new cohort of seedlings. The North American definition would in turn exclude a part of temperate rainforests under definitions used elsewhere.

== Canopy level ==
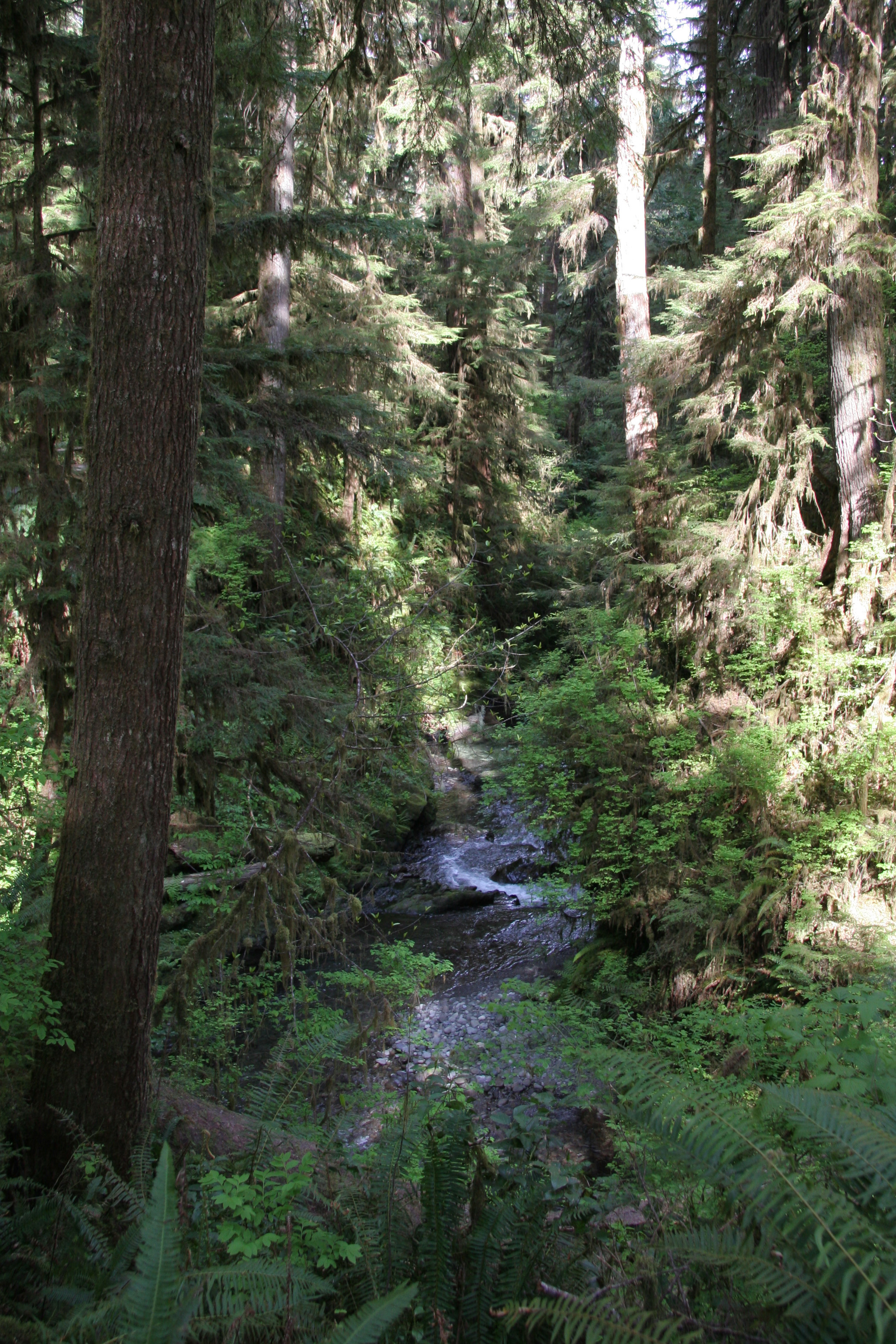
Canopy of Olympic National Park, Washington State

For forests, canopy refers to the upper layer or habitat zone, formed by mature tree crowns and including other biological organisms (epiphytes, lianas, arboreal animals, etc.). The canopy level is the third level of the temperate rainforest. The trees forming the canopy, conifers, can stand as tall as 100 meters or more. A variety of species survive in the canopy. The tops of these trees collect most of the rain, moisture, and photosynthesis that the rainforest takes in. They form a canopy over the forest, covering about 95% of the floor during the summer.

The canopy's coverage affects the shade tolerance levels of forest floor plants. When the canopy is in full bloom, covering about 95% of the floor, plant survival decreases. Some plant species have become shade tolerant in order to survive. The treetops take in the heavy amount of rain and keep the lower levels of the forest damp.

The canopy survives through photosynthesis. The leaves provide energy and nutrients for the trees, which provide homes and food for the forest. Through satellite data, the radiation use efficiency (RUE) calculates the annual amount of photosynthesis that occurs in temperate rainforests. A diverse amount of photosynthesis occurs based on the location and microclimates of the forest.

== Distribution ==
=== North America ===
==== Pacific temperate Rainforests ====
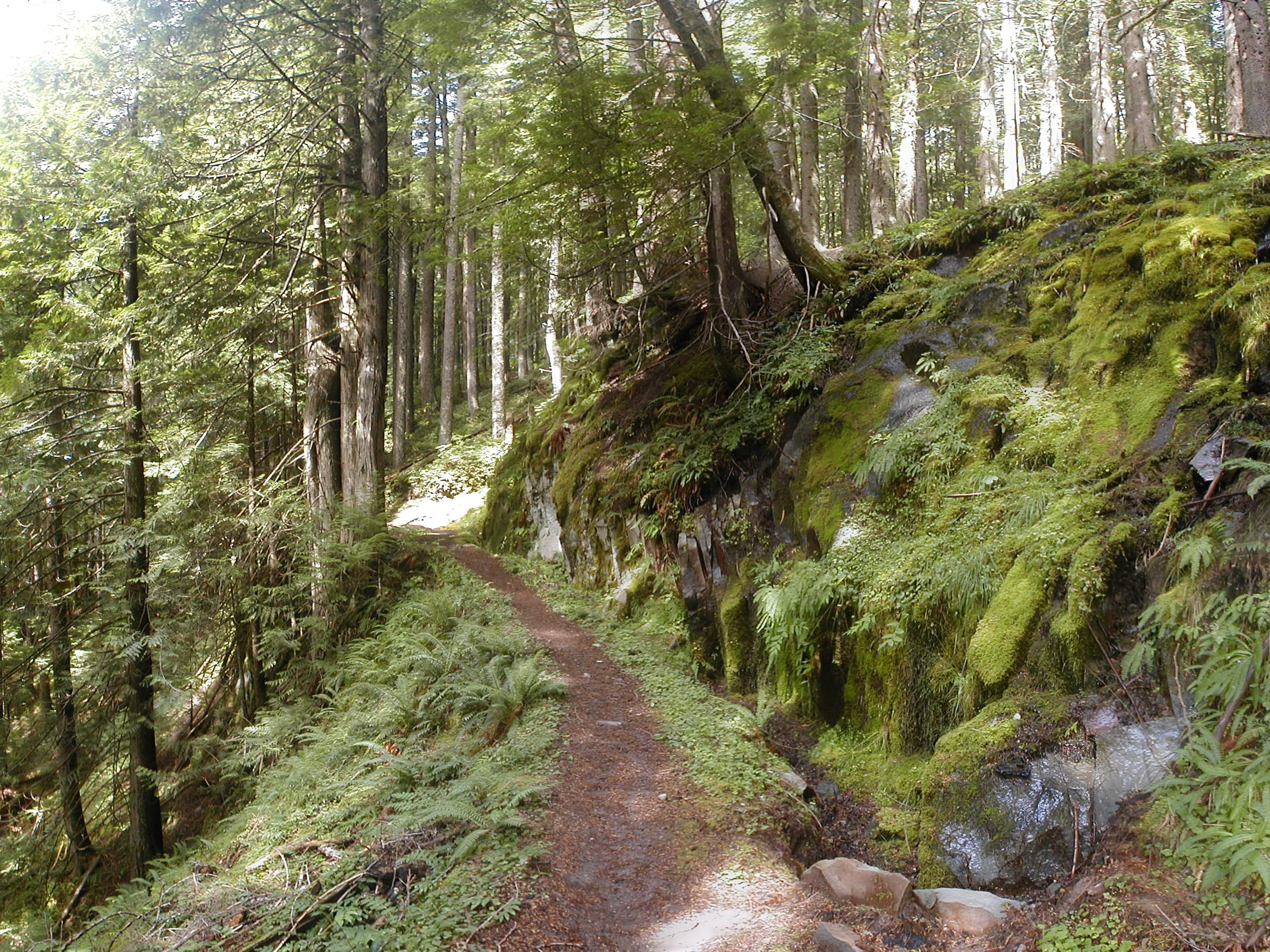
Temperate rainforest in the Mount Hood Wilderness, Oregon, US. This area, on the west side of the mountain, receives close to 100 inches (2,500 mm) of rain per year.

A portion of the temperate rainforest region of North America, the largest area of temperate zone rainforests on the planet, is the Pacific temperate rainforests ecoregion, which occur on west-facing coastal mountains along the Pacific coast of North America, from Kodiak Island in Alaska to northern California, and are part of the Nearctic realm. In the different system established by the Commission for Environmental Cooperation, this same general region is classed as the Pacific Maritime Ecozone by Environment Canada and as the Marine West Coast Forest Level II ecoregion by the United States Environmental Protection Agency. In terms of the floristic province system used by botany, the bulk of the region is the Rocky Mountain Floristic Region but a small southern portion is part of the California Floristic Province.

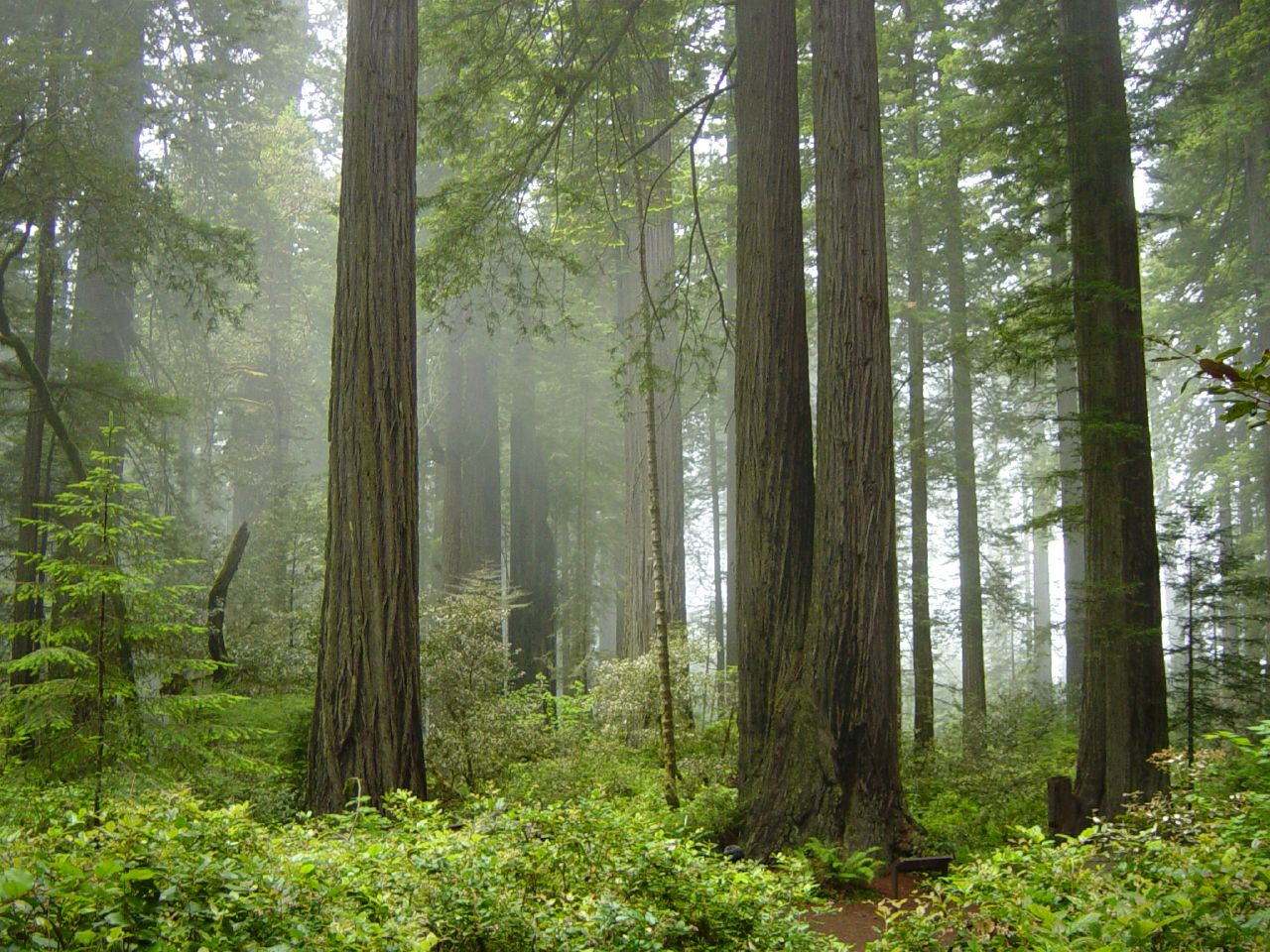
Coast Redwood forest in Redwood National Park

Sub-ecoregions of the Pacific temperate rainforest ecoregion as defined by the WWF include the Northern Pacific coastal forests, Haida Gwaii ecoregion, Vancouver Island ecoregion, British Columbia mainland coastal forests, Central Pacific coastal forests, Cascades forests, Klamath-Siskiyou coastal forests, and Northern California coastal forests ecoregions. They vary in their species composition, but are all predominantly coniferous, sometimes with an understory of broadleaved trees and shrubs. Most of the precipitation occurs in winter, similar to Mediterranean climates, but in summer, fog moisture is extracted by the trees and produces a fog drip keeping the forest moist. The Northern California coastal forests are home to the Coast Redwood (Sequoia sempervirens), the world's tallest tree. In the other ecoregions, Coast Douglas-fir (Pseudotsuga menziesii var. menziesii), Sitka Spruce (Picea sitchensis), Western Hemlock (Tsuga heterophylla) and Western redcedar (Thuja plicata) are the most important tree species. A common feature of Pacific temperate rainforests of North America is the Nurse log, a fallen tree which as it decays, provides ecological facilitation to seedlings. Trees such as the Coast Douglas-fir, Western Hemlock, Western Red Cedar, Pacific Yew, and Vine Maple are more closely related to coniferous and deciduous trees in the temperate forests of East Asia.

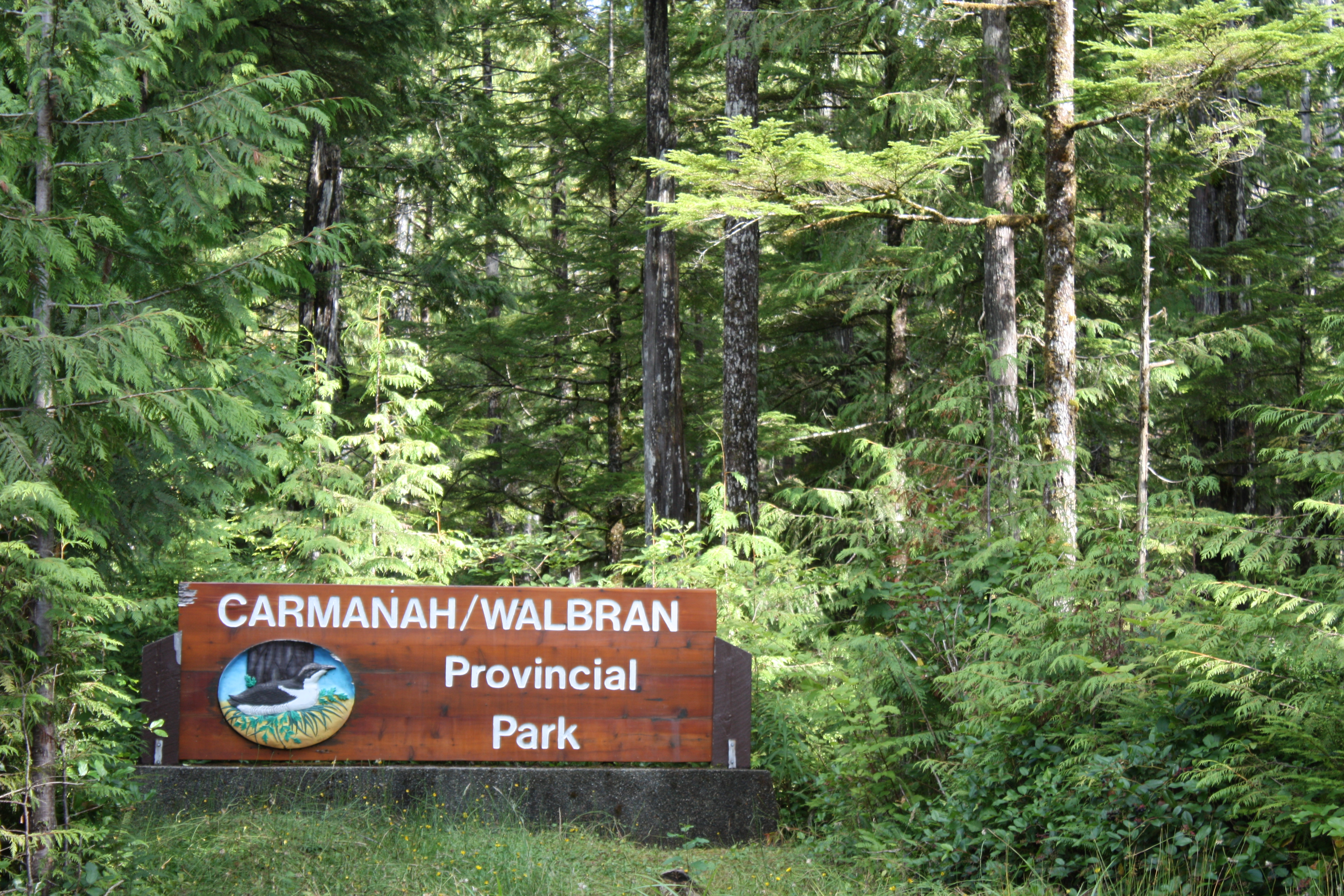
Temperate rainforest in Carmanah Walbran Provincial Park, located on Vancouver Island

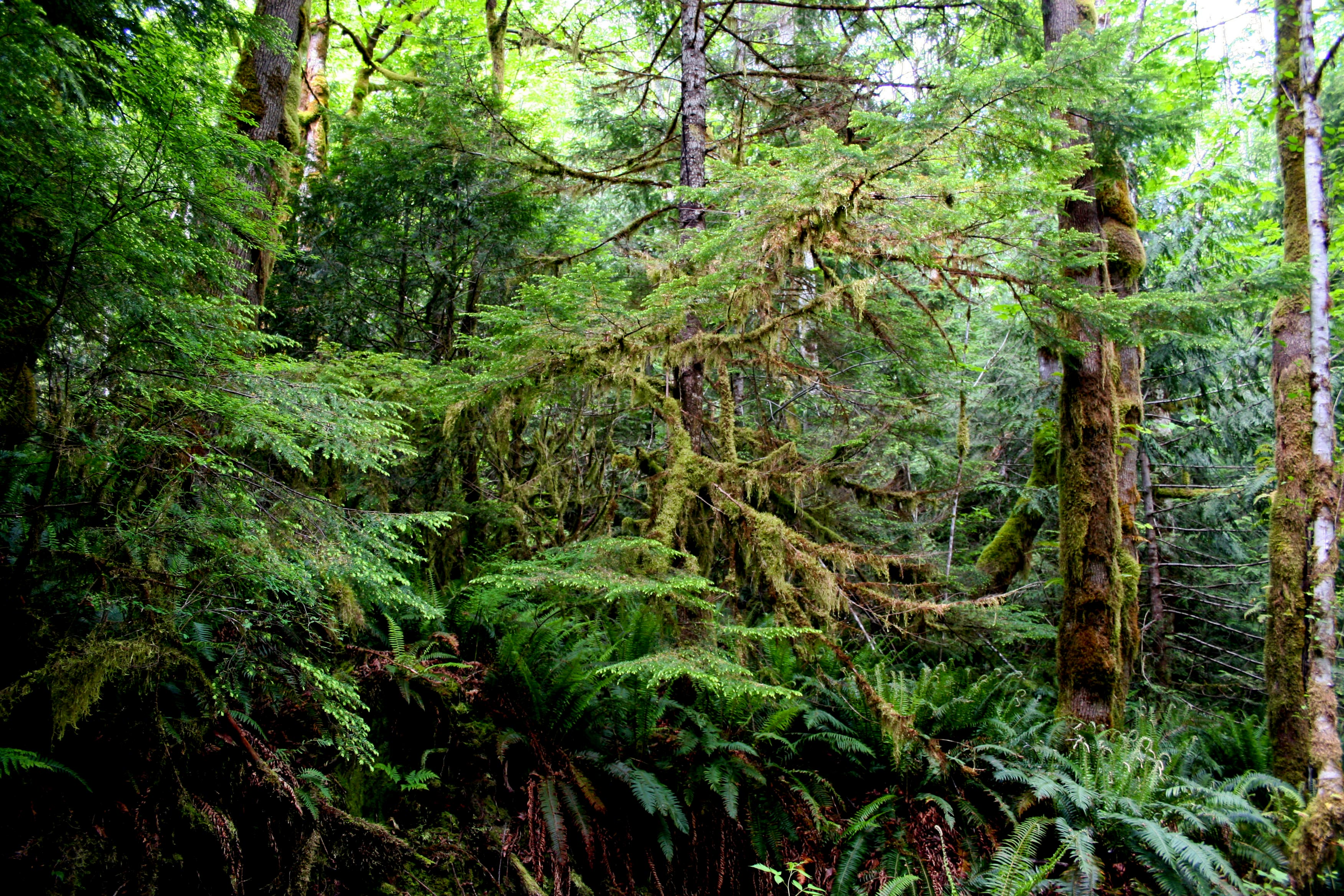
Temperate rainforest in Wells Gray Provincial Park (in the Cariboo Mountains) in British Columbia, Canada

Some of the largest expanses of old growth are found in Olympic National Park, Mount Rainier National Park, Mount Hood National Forest, Crater Lake National Park, Tongass National Forest, Mount St. Helens National Monument, Redwood National Park, and throughout British Columbia (including British Columbia's Coastal Mountain Ranges), with the coastal Great Bear Rainforest containing the largest expanses of old growth temperate rainforest found in the world.

British Columbia's Rocky Mountains, Cariboo Mountains, Rocky Mountain Trench (east of Prince George) and the Columbia Mountains of Southeastern British Columbia (west of the Canadian Rocky Mountains that extend into parts of Idaho and Northwestern Montana in the US), which include the Selkirk Mountains, Monashee Mountains, and the Purcell Mountains, have the largest stretch of interior temperate coniferous rainforests. These inland rainforests have more continental climate with a large proportion of the precipitation falling as snow. Being closer to the Rocky Mountains, there is more of a diverse mammalian fauna. Some of the best interior rainforests are found in Mount Revelstoke National Park and Glacier National Park (Canada) in the Columbia Mountains.

==== Appalachian temperate rainforests ====
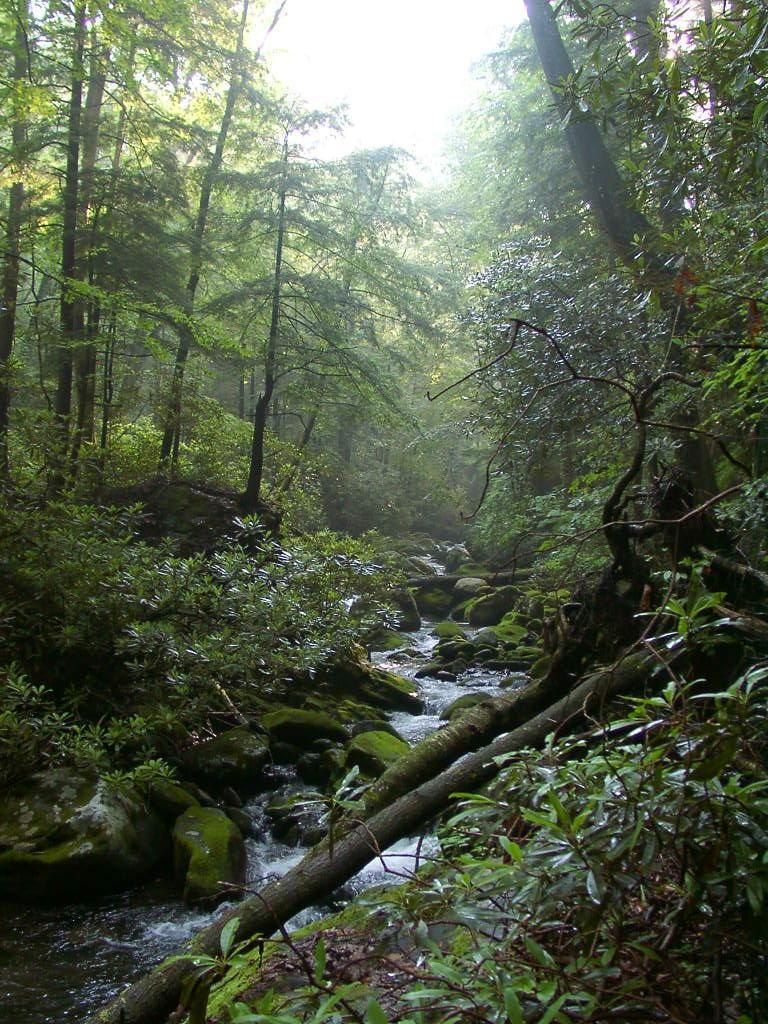
Temperate rainforest in the Great Smoky Mountains National Park in the Appalachian Mountains, the most biodiverse national park in the United States

Temperate rainforests are located in the southern Appalachian Mountains where orographic precipitation increases precipitation of weather systems coming from the west and from the Gulf of Mexico. Temperate rainforest extends through the Appalachian areas of western North Carolina, southeastern Kentucky, southwest Virginia, eastern Tennessee, northern South Carolina, and northern Georgia.

Red spruce and Fraser fir are dominant canopy trees in high mountain areas. In higher elevation (over 1,980 metres; 6,500 feet), Fraser fir is dominant, in middle elevation (1,675 to 1,890 metres; 5,495 to 6,201 ft) red spruce and Fraser fir grow together, and in lower elevation (1,370 to 1,650 metres; 4,490 to 5,410 ft) red spruce is dominant. Yellow birch, mountain ash, and mountain maple grow in the understory. Younger spruce and fir and shrubs like raspberry, blackberry, hobblebush, southern mountain cranberries, red elderberry, minniebush, southern bush honeysuckle are understory vegetation. Below the spruce-fir forest, at around 1,200 metres (3,900 ft), are forests of American beech, yellow birch, maple birch, and oak. Skunk cabbage and ground juniper are northern species that were pushed into the areas from the north.

The mild and wet environment supports the high diversity of fungi. Over 2,000 species live in this area and scientists estimate many unidentified fungi may be there.[10]

=== South America ===
==== Valdivian and Magellanic temperate rainforests ====
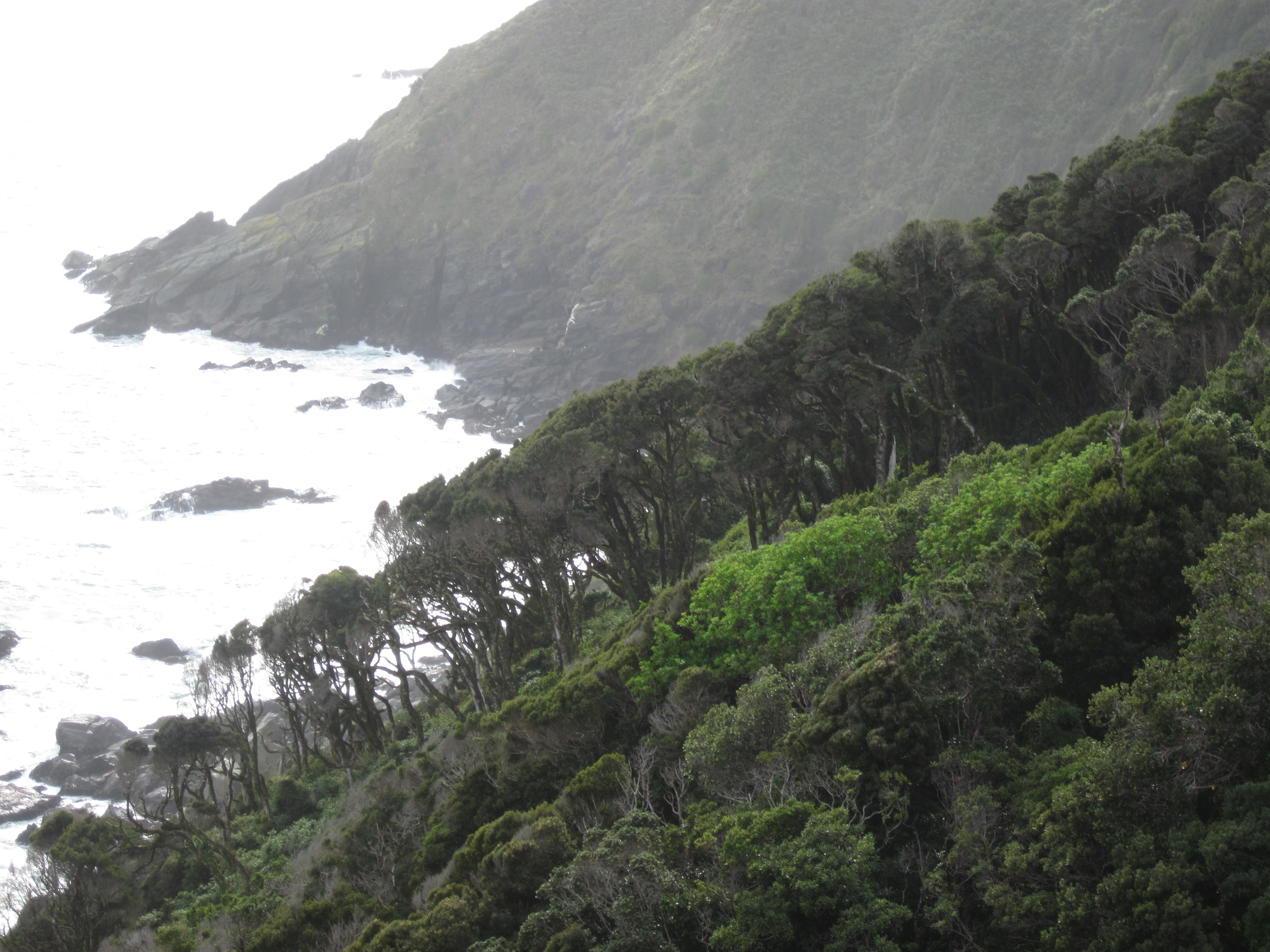
Aextoxicon punctatum forest in Punta Curiñanco

The temperate rainforests of South America are located on the Pacific coast of southern Chile, on the west-facing slopes of the southern Chilean coast range, and the Andes Mountains in both Chile and Western Argentina down to the southern tip of South America, and are part of the Neotropical realm. Temperate rainforests occur in the Valdivian temperate forests and Magellanic subpolar forests ecoregions. The Valdivian rainforests are home to a variety of broadleaf evergreen trees, like Aextoxicon punctatum, Eucryphia cordifolia, and southern beech (Nothofagus), but include many conifers as well, notably Alerce (Fitzroya cupressoides), one of the largest tree species of the world.

The Valdivian and Magellanic temperate rainforests are the only temperate rainforests in South America. Together they are the second largest in the world, after the Pacific temperate rainforests of North America. The Valdivian forests are a refuge for the Antarctic flora, and share many plant families and genera with the temperate rainforests of Australia and New Zealand. Fully half the species of woody plants are endemic to this ecoregion.

In the Valdivian region the Andean Cordillera intercepts moist westerly winds along the Pacific coast during winter and summer months; these winds cool as they ascend the mountains, creating heavy rainfall on the mountains' west-facing slopes. The northward-flowing oceanic Humboldt Current creates humid and foggy conditions near the coast. The tree line is at about 2,400 m in the northern part of the ecoregion (35°S), and descends to 1,000 m in the south of the Valdivian region. In the summer the temperature can climb to 16.5 °C (61.7 °F), while during winter the temperature can drop below 7 °C (45 °F).

=== Africa ===
==== Knysna-Amatole coastal rainforests (South Africa) ====
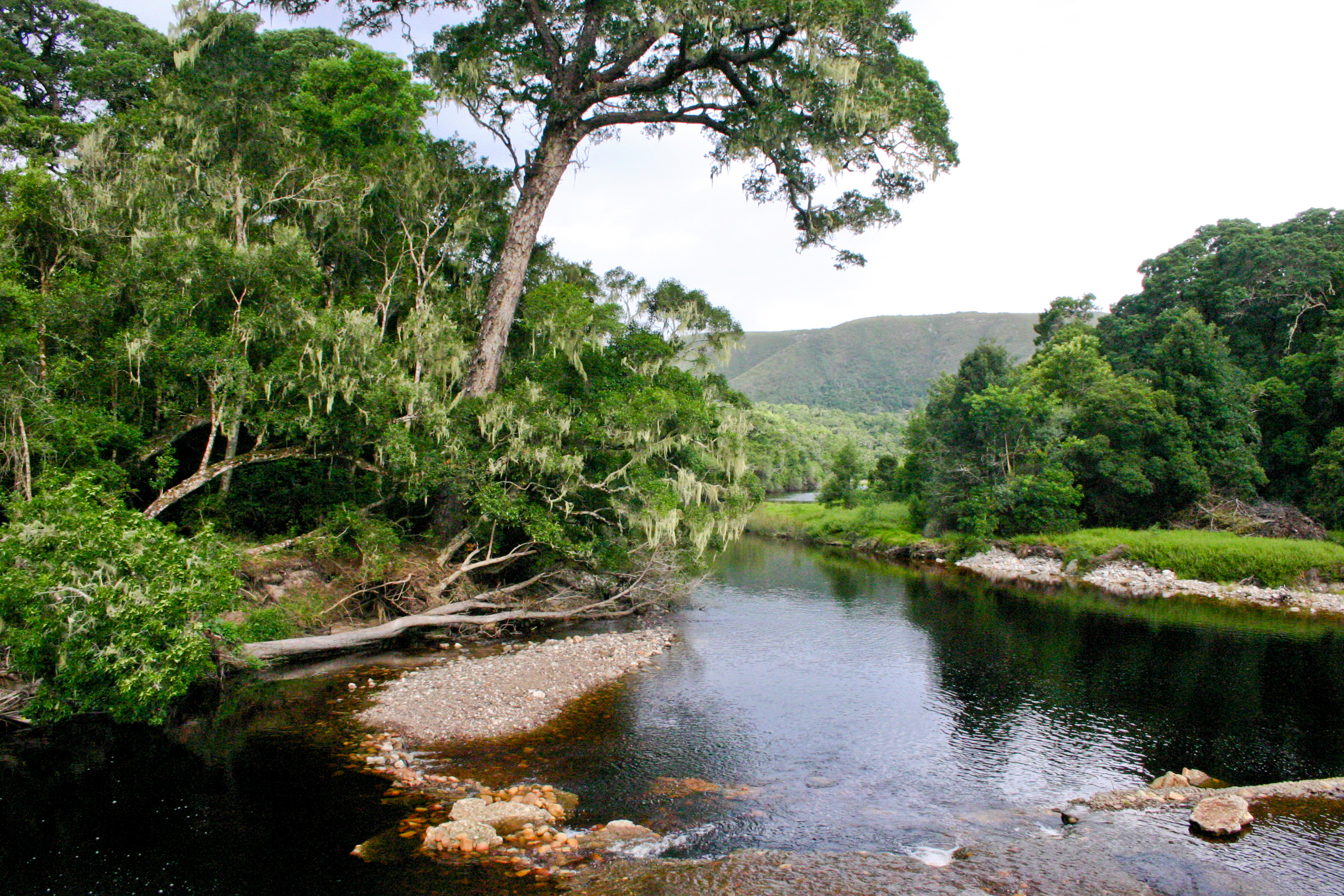
Knysna Forest Biome near Nature's Valley, in the Tsitsikamma, South Africa

The temperate rainforests of South Africa are part of the Knysna-Amatole forests that are located along South Africa's Garden Route between Cape Town and Port Elizabeth on the south-facing slopes of South Africa's Drakensberg Mountains facing the Indian Ocean. There are several coniferous podocarps that grow here. This forest receives a lot of moisture as fog from the Indian Ocean, and resembles not only other temperate rainforests worldwide, but also the montane evergreen Afromontane forests that occur at higher elevations in southern and eastern Africa. A fine example of this forest is in South Africa's Tsitsikamma National Park.

=== Macaronesia ===
==== Azores ====
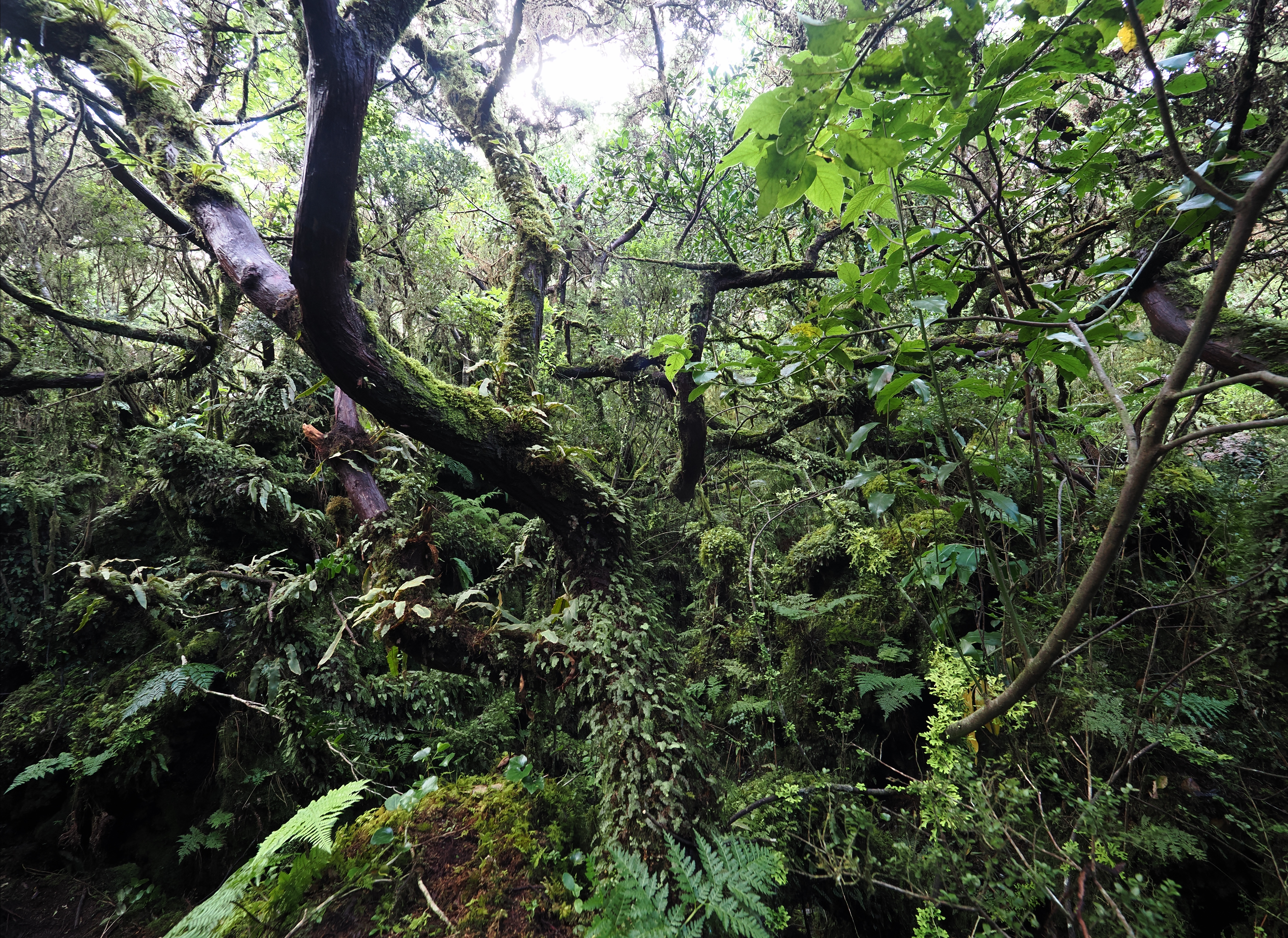
Juniper montane rainforest, in Mistérios Negros, Terceira Island, Azores

The rainforests of the Azores (also known as cloud forests, due to the constant cloud coverage caused by orographic lift) are found in the more humid, montane areas that transition from the lower altitude laurissilva. They are generally found at altitudes ranging from 600 to 1,000 m (2,000 to 3,300 ft), and receive 2,000 to 6,000 mm (79 to 236 in) of average annual rainfall.

Despite being located in the temperate zone, the Azores rainforest is similar in many ways to the cloud forest environments of the tropics and subtropics. These pluvial montane forests hold the highest biodiversity and degree of endemism of the whole archipelago. They are dominated by dense formations of endemic juniper, laurel, holly and tree heaths with several species of epiphytic ferns and an abundance of mosses and rainforest lichens (such as Erioderma).

The climate in the rainforest is mild and cool, averaging 12 °C (54 °F) with a narrow diurnal temperature range and temperatures that only drop below freezing in exceptional years.

Since human settlement in the 15th century, these rainforests, which once covered most of the high altitudes of the archipelago, have gradually been reduced to relics and are now found almost exclusively on three of the nine islands (Flores, Pico and Terceira). Their main threat is the expansion of cattle grazing pastures.

=== Europe ===
Temperate rainforest occurs in fragments across the north and west of Europe in countries such as southern Norway (see Scandinavian coastal conifer forests) and northern Spain. Other temperate rainforest regions include areas of south eastern Europe such as mountains on the east coast of the Adriatic Sea, surrounding North Western Bulgaria along with the Black Sea.

==== Atlantic Oakwood forest (Britain and Ireland) ====
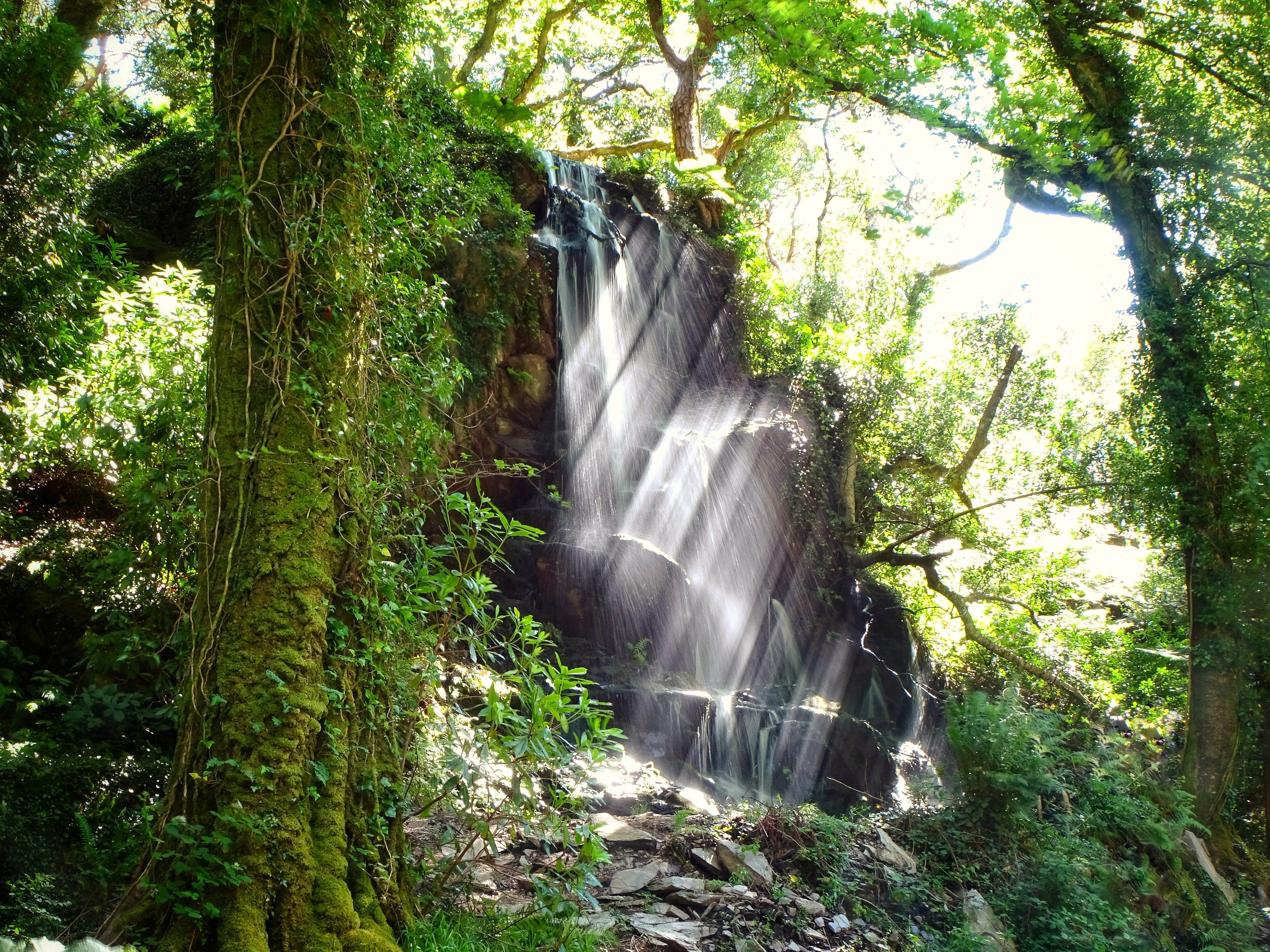
Temperate rainforest at Kells Bay, County Kerry, Ireland

The woodlands are variously referred to in Britain as Upland Oakwoods, Atlantic Oakwoods, Western Oakwoods or Temperate Rainforest, Caledonian forest, and colloquially as 'Celtic Rainforests'. They are also listed in the British National Vegetation Classification as British NVC community W11 and British NVC community W17 depending on the ground flora. The majority of surviving fragments of Atlantic Oakwoods in Britain occur on steep-sided slopes above rivers and lakes which have avoided clearance and intensive grazing pressure. There are notable examples on the islands and shores of Loch Maree, Loch Sunart, Loch Lomond and one of the best preserved sites on the remote Taynish Peninsula in Argyll. There are also small areas on steep-sided riverine gorges in Snowdonia and Mid Wales, such as found at the Dolmelynllyn Estate in Gwynedd.

In England, they occur in the Lake District (Borrowdale Woods) and steep sided riverine and estuarine valleys in Devon and Cornwall and the Microclimate disused slate & granite quarries in these counties. This includes the Fowey valley in Cornwall and the valley of the river Dart which flows off Dartmoor and has rainfall in excess of 2 metres per year.

Derrycunnihy Wood, located in the Killarney National Park, is the best example of the ancient damp-climate oceanic forest that covered an estimated 80 percent of Ireland prior to the arrival of humans in 7,000 BCE.

Guy Shrubsole's Lost Rainforests of Britain attempts to find, map, photograph, and restore them.

==== Colchian (Colchis) rainforests (Bulgaria, Turkey and Georgia) ====
The Colchian rainforests are found around both the southeast and west corners of the Black Sea starting in Bulgaria all the way to Turkey and Georgia and are part of the Euxine-Colchic deciduous forests ecoregion, together with the drier Euxine forests further west. The Colchian rainforests are mixed, with deciduous black alder (Alnus glutinosa), hornbeam (Carpinus betulus and C. orientalis), Oriental beech (Fagus orientalis), and sweet chestnut (Castanea sativa) together with evergreen Nordmann fir (Abies nordmanniana, the tallest tree in Europe at 78 m), Caucasian spruce (Picea orientalis) and Scots pine (Pinus sylvestris). The refugium is the largest throughout the Western Asian / near Eastern region. The area has multiple representatives of disjunct relict groups of plants with the closest relatives in Eastern Asia, southern Europe, and even North America. Over 70 species of forest snails of the region are endemic. Some relict species of vertebrates are Caucasian parsley frog, Caucasian salamander, Robert's snow vole and Caucasian grouse; they are almost entirely endemic groups of animals such as lizards of genus Darevskia. In general, species composition of this refugium is quite distinct and differs from that of the other Western Eurasian refugia. Genetic data suggest that the Colchis temperate rainforest, during the Ice Age, was fragmented into smaller parts; in particular, evolutionary lineages of the Caucasian Salamander from the central and south-western Colchis remained isolated from one another during the entire Ice Age.

==== Fragas do Eume (Spain) ====
The Fragas do Eume is a natural park situated in Galicia, north-western Spain. Fraga is a Galician word for 'natural woodland', (old-growth forest) and the park is an example of a temperate rainforest in which oak (Quercus robur and Quercus pyrenaica) is the climax vegetation. The protected area extends along the valley of the river Eume within the Ferrolterra municipalities of Pontedeume, Cabanas, A Capela, Monfero and As Pontes de García Rodríguez. Some 500 people reside within the park. The monastery of Monastery of San Xoán de Caaveiro also lies within the park.

The area was declared a natural park (a level of protection lower than national park) in 1997. It is one of six natural parks in Galicia. The European Union has recognised the park as a Site of Community Importance. There are a number of species of ferns. Invertebrate species include the Kerry slug and it is an important site for amphibians.

==== Vinatovača rainforest (Serbia) ====
The Vinatovača rainforest, alternatively spelled Vintovača, is the only rainforest in Serbia. It has been left undisturbed for centuries due to strict conservation laws starting in the 17th century.

Vinatovača is situated in the central Kučaj mountains in the Upper Resava region, at an altitude between 640 m (2,100 ft) and 800 m (2,600 ft). It is isolated and hard to reach which helped its preservation. It is believed that trees have not been cut in Vinatovača since about 1650. Being under strict protection means not only that the trees that die of old age are not being cleared or removed, but even picking some herbs or mushrooms is forbidden. It is considered as an example of what central and eastern Serbia's natural look is. Beech trees are up to 45 m (148 ft) tall and some specimens are estimated to be over 300 years old.

=== Asia ===
==== Caspian Hyrcanian forest (Iran and Azerbaijan) ====
The Caspian Hyrcanian mixed forests ecoregion in northern Iran contains a jungle in the form of a rainforest which stretches from the east in the Khorasan province to the west in the Ardabil Province, covering the other provinces of Gilan, Mazandaran, and Golestan. The Elburz or Alborz mountain range is the highest mountain range in the Middle East which captures the moisture of the Caspian Sea to its north and forms subtropical and temperate rainforests in the northern part of Iran. The Iranians call this forest and region Shomal which means north in Persian. This forest was known for most of the history for being home to the now extinct Caspian Tiger.

In southeast Azerbaijan, this ecoregion includes the Lankaran Lowland and the Talysh Mountains, the latter being evenly divided with Iran to the south. They are deciduous forests containing tree species such as black alder (Alnus glutinosa subsp. barbata), hornbeam (Carpinus betulus and C. orientalis), Caucasian wingnut (Pterocarya fraxinifolia), chestnut-leaved oak (Quercus castaneifolia), Caucasian oak (Quercus macranthera), oriental beech (Fagus orientalis), Persian ironwood (Parrotia persica) and Persian silk tree (Albizia julibrissin).

The existing protected areas in Azerbaijan include:

- Gizil-Agach State Reserve – 88.4 square kilometres (34.1 mi^{2})
- Hirkan National Park – 427.97 square kilometres (165.24 mi^{2})
- Zuvand National Park – 15 square kilometres (5.8 mi^{2})
- Girkan State Reserve – 3 square kilometres (1.2 mi^{2})

==== High elevation mountain rainforests (Taiwan) ====
These forests are found in eastern Taiwan and Taiwan's Central Mountain Ranges, part of the Taiwan subtropical evergreen forest region covering the higher elevations. Most of the lower elevations are covered by subtropical broadleaf evergreen forests, dominated by Chinese cryptocarya (Cryptocarya chinensis), Castanopsis hystrix and Japanese blue oak (Quercus glauca). Higher elevations give way to temperate forests with large stands of old growth Taiwan cypress (Chamaecyparis taiwanensis), camphor tree (Cinnamomum camphora), maple (Acer spp.), Chinese yew (Taxus chinensis), Taiwan hemlock (Tsuga chinensis), and Taiwan Douglas-fir (Pseudotsuga sinensis var. wilsoniana). These higher elevation forests also include the giant conifers Formosan cypress (Chamaecyparis formosensis) and Taiwania (Taiwania cryptomerioides). Some fine examples of forests are found in Yushan (Jade Mountain) National Park and Alishan.

==== Baekdu Mountain Range (Taebaek and Sobaek Mountain Ranges) and South Sea forests (Korea) ====
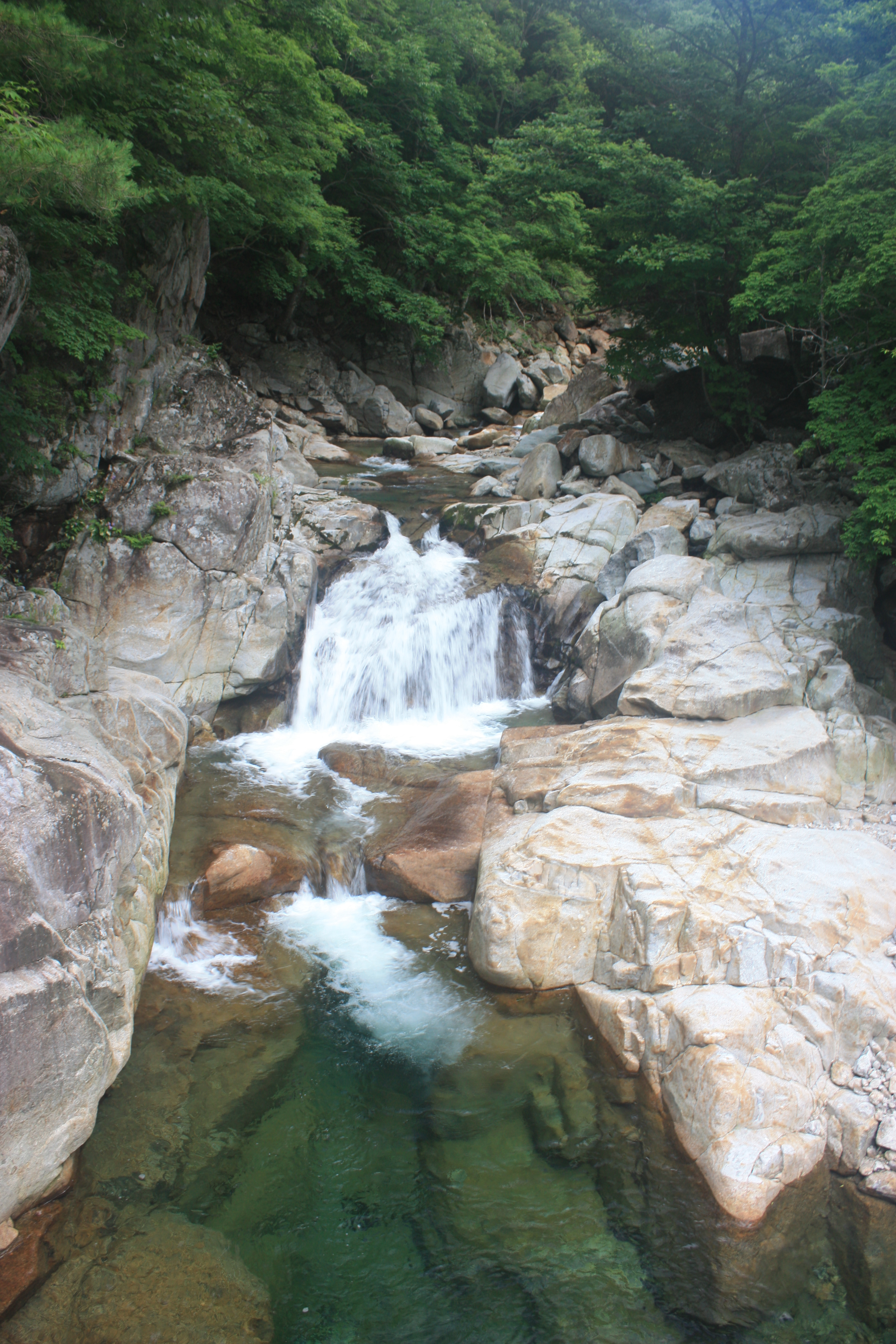
Baemsagol valley of Jirisan, which is the southern end of Baekdu Mountain Range.

The forests that cover the mountains and valleys of the Baekdu Mountain Range – from Mt. Baekdu, in the north, to Mt. Jiri, in the southwest, forming the spine of the Korean Peninsula – and the southern coast and islands of the peninsula – including Jeju Island – feature a wide variety of conifers and broadleaf trees. Much of these forests are protected in mountain and marine national forests, such as in Hallyeohaesang National Park, which encompasses 150.14 km^{2} (57.97 sq mi) of mountainous forests spread out over 69 uninhabited islands and 30 inhabited islands in Korea's South Sea that provide a home to 1,142 plant species, including major species such as red pine, black pine, common camellia, serrata oak, and cork oak, as well as rare species such as nadopungnan (Phalaenopsis japonica), daeheongnan (Cymbidium macrorhizon) and the Korean winter hazel (Corylopsis coreana). Major animals species, such as otters, small-eared cats, and badgers also call Hallyeohaesang National Park home, and overall there are 25 mammal species, 115 bird species, 16 reptile species, 1,566 insect species, and 24 freshwater fish species found among the forested, mountains islands.

Seoraksan National Park covers 398.539 km^{2} (153.877 sq mi) of mountainous forests near the eastern coast of the Korean Peninsula, and is a UNESCO designated Biosphere Preservation District. Over 2,000 animal species live in Seoraksan, including the Korean goral, musk deer, and there are also more than 1,400 rare plant species, such as the edelweiss.

==== Taiheiyo (Pacific) rainforests (Japan) ====
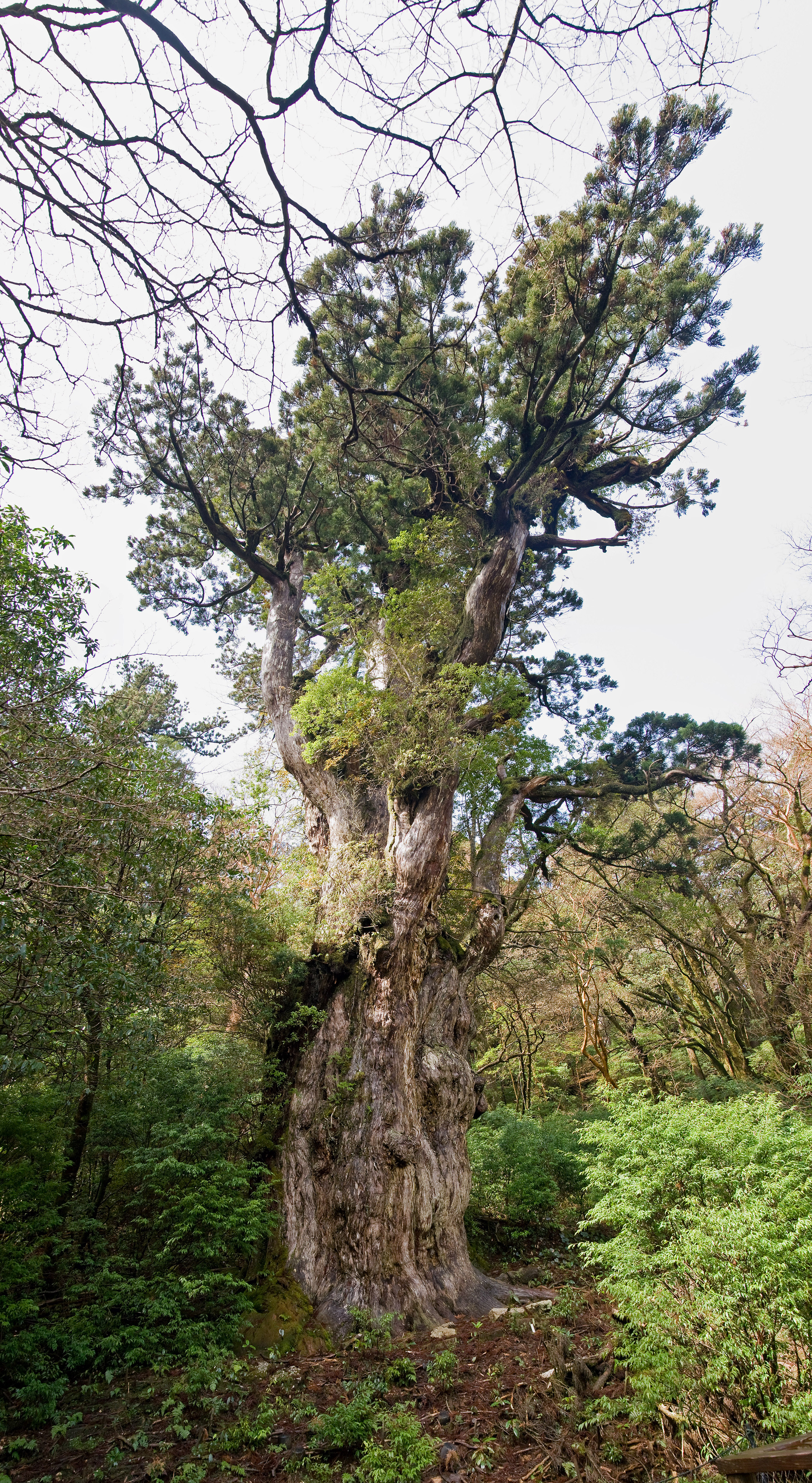
Jōmon Sugi, the largest specimen of Japanese Cedar (Cryptomeria japonica), on Yakushima, Japan

Southwestern Japan's Taiheiyo evergreen forests region covers much of Shikoku and Kyūshū Islands, and the Southern/Pacific Ocean-facing side of Honshu ("Taiheiyo" is the Pacific Ocean, in Japanese). Here the natural forests are mainly broadleaf evergreen in lower elevations and deciduous in higher elevations. The Hydrangea hirta species is an endemic deciduous species that can be found in this area. The limit occurs at 500–1000 metres depending on latitude. The main tree species are members of beech family (Fagaceae). In lower altitudes these include evergreen oaks (Quercus spp.), Japanese Chinquapin (Castanopsis cuspidata) and Japanese Stone Oak (Lithocarpus edulis), and in higher altitudes Japanese Blue Beech (Fagus japonica) and Siebold's beech (Fagus crenata).

Some of the best preserved examples of forest are found in Kirishima-Yaku National Park on the Island of Yakushima off of Kyūshū in a very wet climate (the annual rainfall is 4,000 to 10,000 mm depending on altitude). Because of relatively infertile soils on granite, Yakushima's forests in higher elevations are dominated by a giant conifer species, Japanese Cedar (Cryptomeria japonica), rather than deciduous forests typical of the mainland. Other areas include Mount Kirishima near Kagoshima in southern Kyūshū. On Southern Honshū, there is a forest with the Nachi Falls located in Yoshino-Kumano National Park. This particular area of Honshū has been described as one of the rainiest spots in Japan.

==== Eastern Himalayan broadleaf forests (Bhutan, India, Nepal) ====
It is a temperate broadleaf forest ecoregion found in the middle elevations of the eastern Himalayas, including parts of Nepal, India, and Bhutan.

==== Temperate rainforests of the Russian Far East ====
The Russian Far East region is the eastern-most region of both Russia and the Asian continent as a whole. The Russian federal subjects of Primorsky Krai and Khabarovsk Krai are located in the southeast of this region, with Primorsky Krai sharing a land border with China and North Korea, and both federal subjects face the Pacific ocean to the east and share maritime borders with Japan. The Sikhote-Alin mountain range is located here and extends for about 1000 km in a northeast direction, parallel to the coast, from near the coastal city of Vladivostok.

Whilst the mountain range ascends from sea level to a maximum altitude of around 1900 metres contains a variety of different habitats, they are located in region with a temperate climate. During the last glacial maximum (or ice age), the area was not glaciated, allowing for the development of a complex ecosystem containing species with origins in Siberia’s boreal forest and Manchuria’s subtropical forests. Temperate rainforest covers most of the mountain slopes and the biogeographic region is known as the Primorye centre of plant diversity, a biogeographic meeting point of flora and fauna from temperate, subtropical and taiga climatic regions. Historically these forests ranged from the southeastern Pacific coast of Russia, through North Korea and into northern China, however vast human development, particularly in China, has limited the forest to its current range in the Russian Far East. In 2001, UNESCO recognized a 1.5 million hectare area of forest in the central part of the Sikhote-Alin mountains as a World Heritage Site in Russia, citing the area as one of the most unique and valuable areas of intact forest in the world

Although not limited to forests, more than 2500 species of vascular plants have been described in the Primorye biographic region, of which many are considered relict and endemic species. Flora of mosses and lichens are particularly diverse. About 200 species are listed in the IUCN Red List as rare and endangered. The forests fall in the transition zone between two biomes: the southern Asian hardwood forest and the northern coniferous forest. The rainforests are a mix of deciduous broadleaf and coniferous forest, with the dominant tree species becoming more coniferous at higher elevations, and more mixed forest found at lower elevations or within mountain valleys. The most common species include the Korean pine (Pinus koraiensis) and Manchurian fir (Abies holophylla) at the lowest elevations and coastlines. Jezo spruce (Picea jezoensis) and Khingan fir (Abies nephrolepis) are common species to be found from 700–1400 metres altitude. Other tree species include Mongolian oak (Quercus mongolica), silver birch (Betula platyphylla), Scots pine (Pinus sylvestris), trembling aspen (Populus tremula), Siberian dwarf pine (Pinus pumila), Erman's birch (Betula ermanii), and Dahurian larch (Larix gmelinii), a deciduous conifer common throughout, but dominant in the northernmost reaches of the forest Other characteristic flora include various ferns, lotus, (Nelumbo nucifera) and the willow Salix arbutifolia, Taxus cuspidata, Juniperus rigida, Phellodendron amurense, Kalopanax, Aralia elata, Maackia amurensis, Alnus japonica, Actinidia kolomikta, Schisandra chinensis, Celastrus orbiculatus, Thladiantha dubia, Weigela, Eleutherococcus, Flueggea suffruticosa, Deutzia, Betula schmidtii, Carpinus cordata, Acer mandshuricum, Parthenocissus tricuspidata, Vitis amurensis, and Panax ginseng and many others.

Along with the neighbouring Amur region of Russia, the temperate rainforests of the Russian Far East hold the last remaining habitats for the critically endangered Siberian tiger, Amur leopard, and Manchurian sika deer. It has been estimated that there are less than 600 tigers and around 90 leopards left in the wild. The area also contains populations of Asiatic black bears, Kamchatka brown bears, and Mongolian grey wolves, as the Russian Far East, altogether, might probably be the only place in the world where endangered tigers, leopards, bears, and grey wolves coexist. This region also happens to be some of the last of habitat of the Blakiston’s fish owl (Bubo blakistoni); along with being the world’s largest owl, it is unique in the way that it eats fish (primarily Masu salmon) and relies on old growth forests along river banks to hunt, nest, and breed. The Siberian grouse is similar to the spruce grouse and Franklin's grouse of North America, and can be found in the dense, remote pockets of broadleaf, coniferous and deciduous forests of Far East Russia. Common ungulates include red deer, roe deer, wild boar, Manchurian moose, and musk deer.

=== Oceania ===
==== Australian temperate rainforests ====
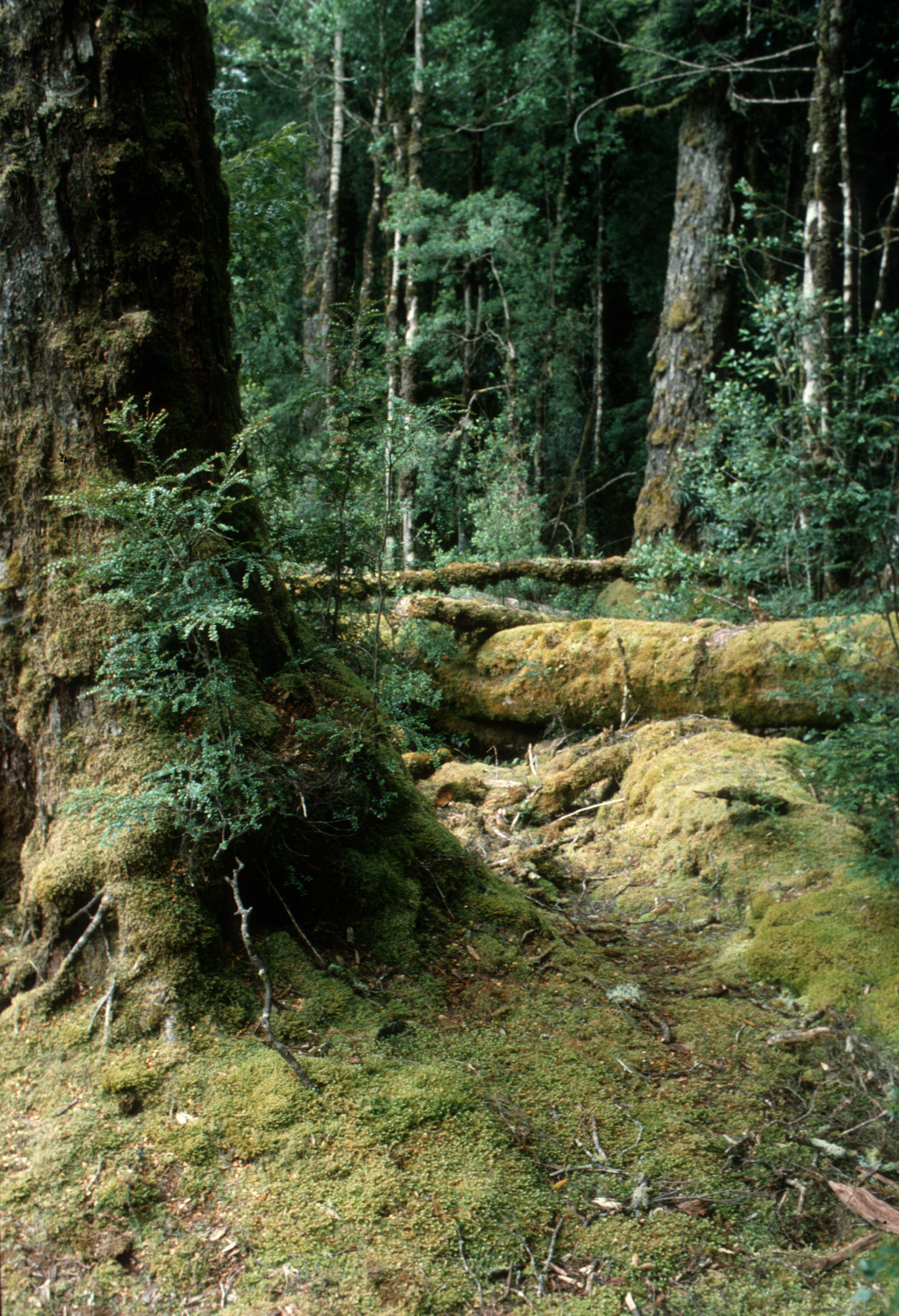
Myrtle beech temperate rainforest in Tasmania, Australia

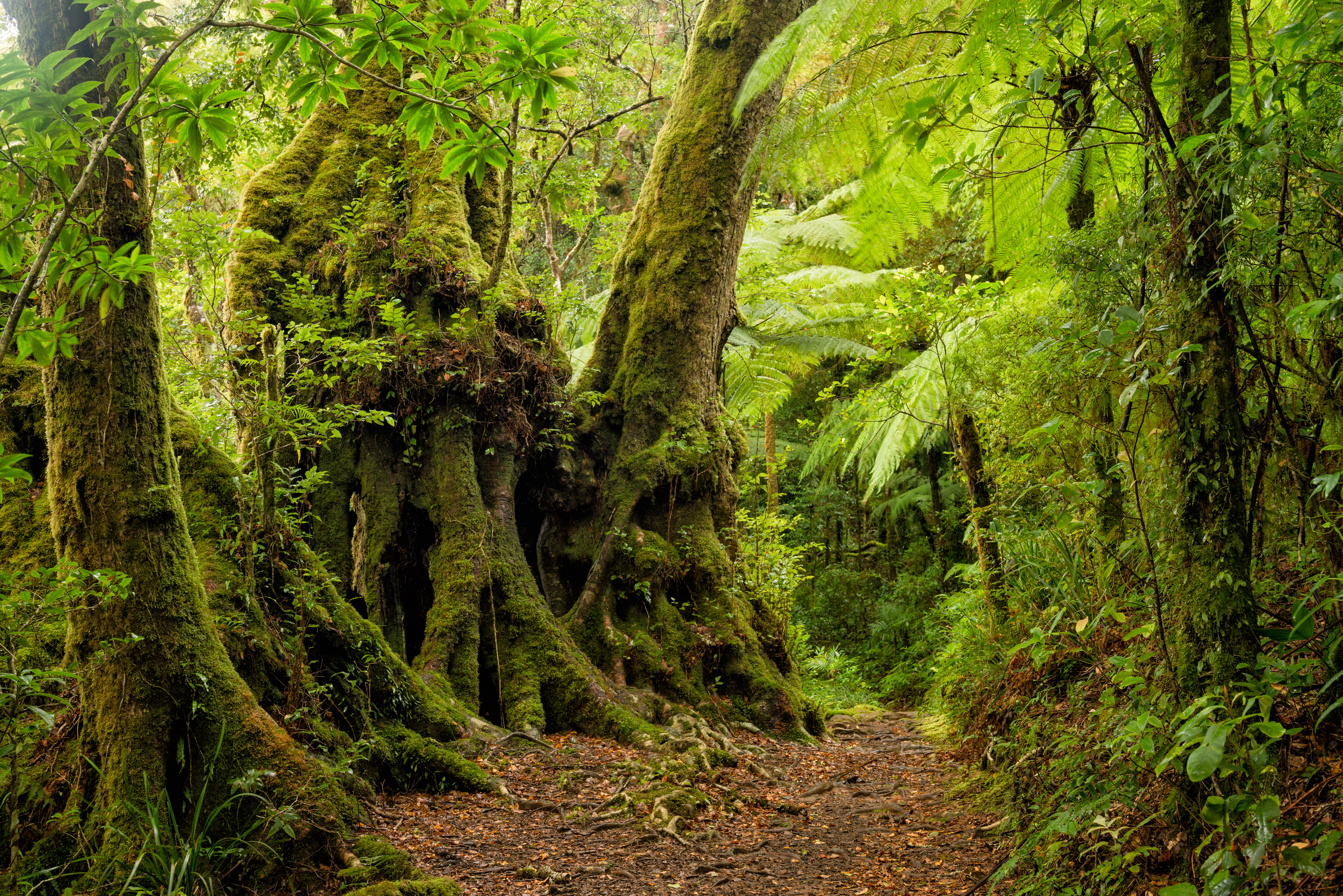
Antarctic beech trees in Lamington National Park, Queensland, Australia

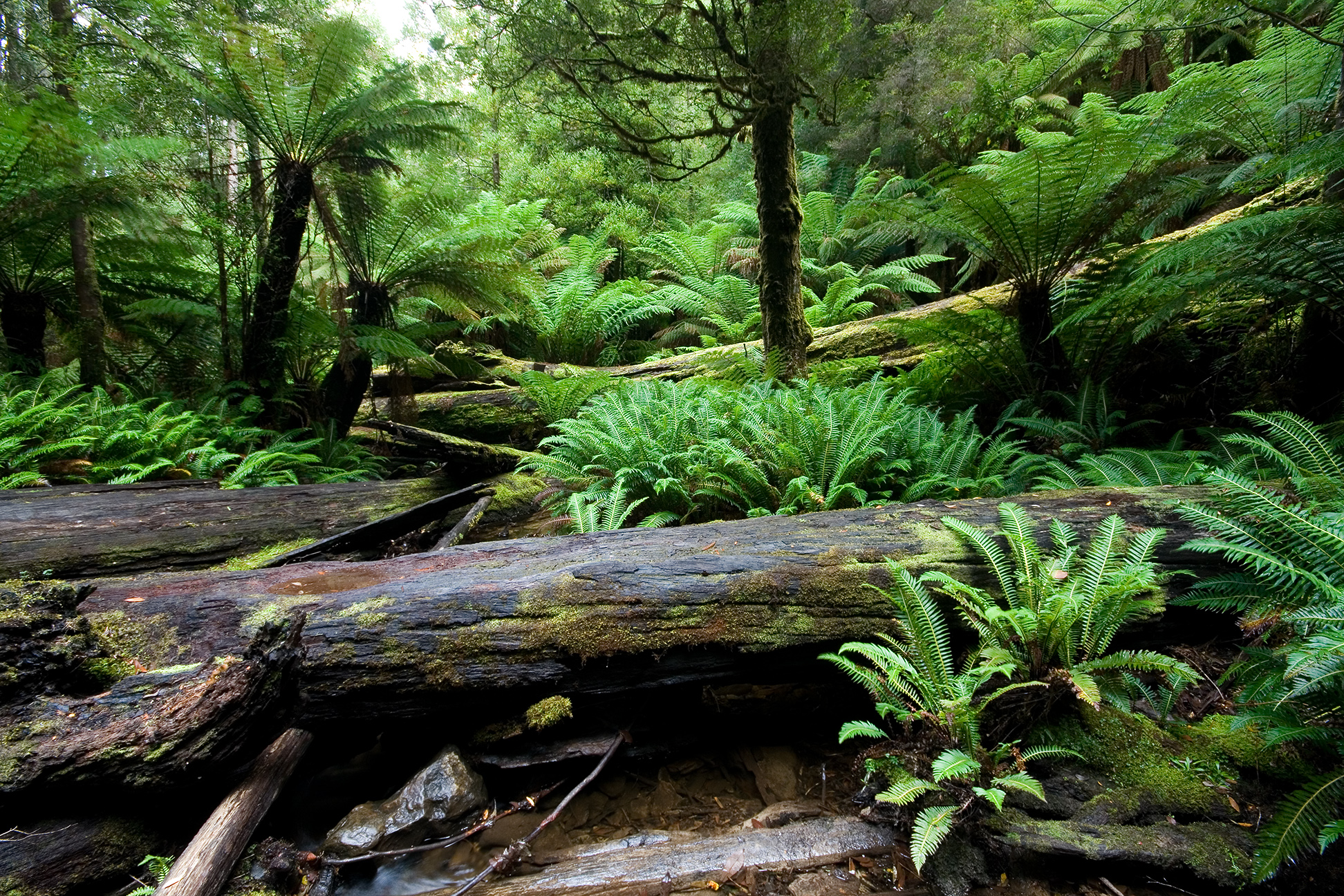
Dicksonia antarctica tree ferns in temperate rainforest in Tasmania, Australia

In Australia rainforests occur near the mainland east coast and in Tasmania. There are warm-temperate and cool-temperate rainforests. They are broadleaf evergreen forests with the exception of montane rainforests of Tasmania. Eucalypt forests are not classified as rainforests although some eucalypt forest types receive high annual rainfall (to over 2000 mm in Tasmania), and in the absence of fire they may develop to rainforest. If these widespread wet sclerophyll forests were considered rainforests, the total area of rainforest in Australia would be much larger.

Warm-temperate rainforest replaces subtropical rainforest on poorer soils or with increasing altitude and latitude in New South Wales and Victoria. Cool-temperate rainforests are widespread in Tasmania (Tasmanian temperate rainforests ecoregion) and they can be found scattered from the World Heritage listed Border Ranges National Park and Lamington National Park on the NSW/Queensland border to Otway Ranges, Strzelecki Ranges, Dandenong Ranges and Tarra Bulga in Victoria. In the northern NSW they are usually dominated by Antarctic beech (Nothofagus moorei), in the southern NSW by pinkwood (Eucryphia moorei) and coachwood (Ceratopetalum apetalum) and in Victoria and Tasmania by myrtle beech (Nothofagus cunninghamii), southern sassafras (Atherosperma moschatum) and mountain ash (Eucalyptus regnans). The montane rainforests of Tasmania are dominated by Tasmanian endemic conifers (mainly Athrotaxis spp.). They are dominated by ferns such as Cyathea cooperi, Cyathea australis, Dicksonia antarctica, Cyathea cunninghamii and Cyathea leichhardtiana.

==== New Zealand temperate rainforests ====
The temperate rainforests of New Zealand occur on the western shore of the South Island and on the North Island. The forests are made up of coniferous podocarps and broadleaf evergreen trees. The podocarps are abundant at lower elevations, while southern beech (Nothofagus) can be found on higher slopes and in the cooler southernmost rainforests. Ecoregions include the Fiordland temperate forests and Westland temperate rainforests.

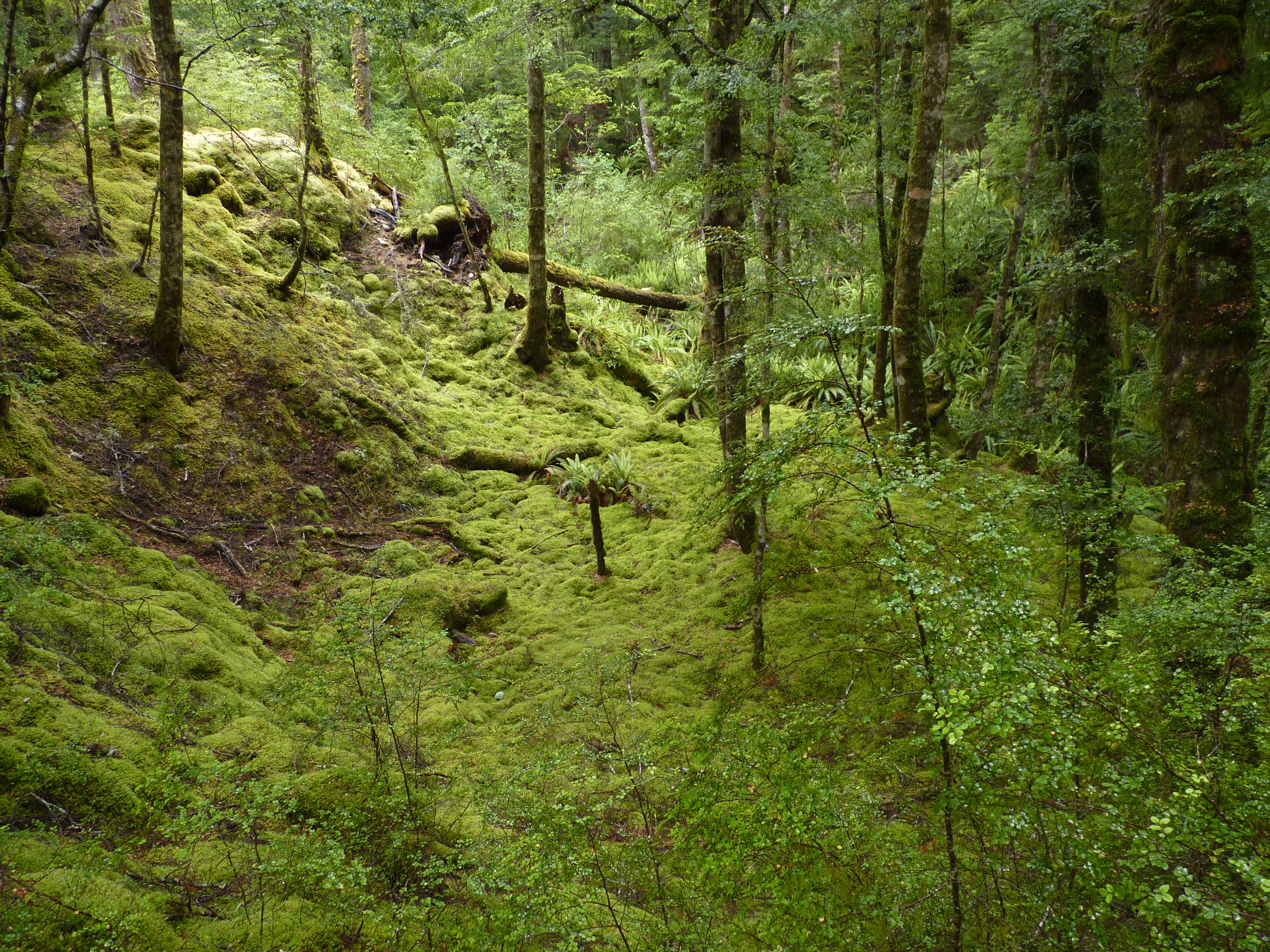
Fiordland National Park near Te Anau, New Zealand
