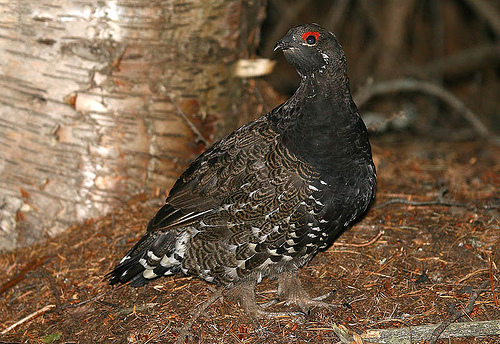
- Franklin's grouse

Conservation status
- Least Concern (IUCN 3.1)

Scientific classification
- Kingdom: Animalia
- Phylum: Chordata
- Class: Aves
- Order: Galliformes
- Family: Phasianidae
- Genus: Canachites
- Species: C. canadensis
- Subspecies: C. c. franklinii

Trinomial name
- Canachites canadensis franklinii (Douglas, 1829)

Synonyms
- Dendragapus canadensis franklinii; Falcipennis franklinii; Canachites franklinii

= Franklin's grouse =

Species of bird

Franklin's grouse (Canachites canadensis franklinii) is a subspecies of the spruce grouse found in the Northwest Territories, British Columbia, and Alberta.

== Taxonomy ==
The species was discovered in 1805 by the Lewis and Clark Expedition, but was not scientifically described until 1829, by David Douglas. Douglas gave it the scientific name Tetrao franklini, in honor of Sir John Franklin.

In 2014, it was split by the IUCN as a distinct species from the spruce grouse Canachites canadensis after being considered a subspecies. However, as of early 2021 the International Ornithological Congress (IOC), the American Ornithological Society, and the Clements taxonomy retain C. f. franklinii and C. f. isleibi as subspecies of spruce grouse.

An isolated population, now treated as a distinct subspecies, C. c. isleibi (or C. f. isleibi when franklinii is considered a distinct species), is found on Prince of Wales Island and the nearby Alexander Archipelago in southeast Alaska.

== Description ==
Franklin's grouse closely resembles other subspecies of the spruce grouse. The main difference is the tail: the male's tail is entirely black, lacking the chestnut terminal tail band of the spruce grouse, and has white spots overlaying it, creating a contrast between the black. The spots in juvenile males are smaller and thus less contrasting.

== Behaviour ==
Males are notable for their wing-clap display. At the end of a short flight through the trees, the wings are brought together over the back so as to produce two sharp claps loud enough to be heard by the human ear 100 yards (91.4 meters) away. Occasionally, these territorial displays can be elicited by similar hand clapping, and can be used to detect male territories and estimate their density. While the claps may be used to advertise to females, it is more frequently a territorial display, as evidenced by the fact that wandering yearlings are less likely to wing-clap than yearlings with established ranges. Males may also hoot during the breeding season in response to challengers. During the breeding season, females also utter a call, meant to scare off other females with whom they would compete for males.

Males do not participate in raising young. The grouse feed on insects as chicks, and adults eat plant matter such as evergreen needles (especially those of the Western larch and various pine species).
