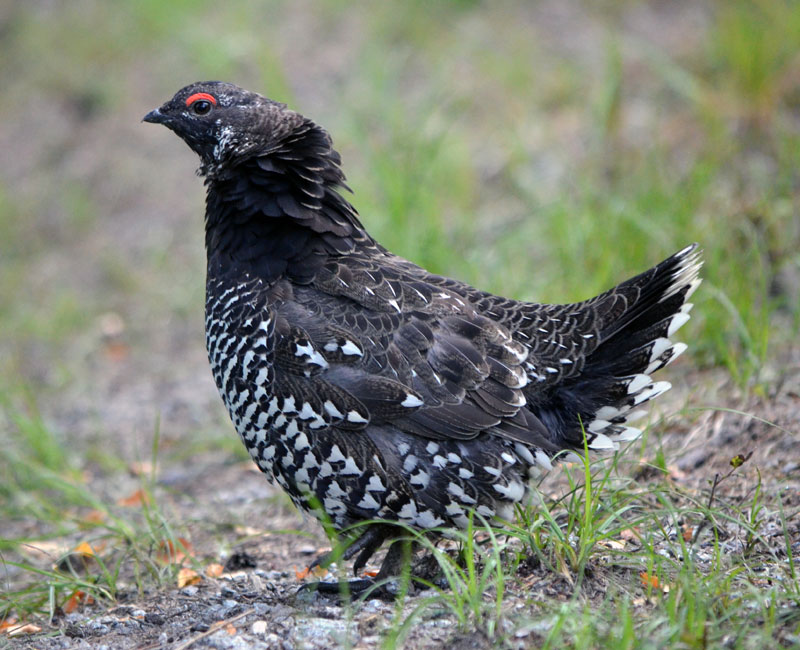

Conservation status
- Least Concern (IUCN 3.1)

Scientific classification
- Kingdom: Animalia
- Phylum: Chordata
- Class: Aves
- Order: Galliformes
- Family: Phasianidae
- Tribe: Tetraonini
- Genus: Falcipennis; Elliot, DG, 1864
- Species: F. falcipennis

Binomial name
- Falcipennis falcipennis (Hartlaub, 1855)

Synonyms
- Dendragapus falcipennis

= Siberian grouse =

Species of bird

The Siberian grouse (Falcipennis falcipennis), also known as Siberian spruce grouse, Amur grouse, or Asian spruce grouse, is a short, rotund forest-dwelling grouse. A sedentary, non-migratory bird, it is the only member of the genus Falcipennis. The spruce grouse of North America, which physically looks similar, is now placed in the monotypic genus Canachites.

== Description ==
Adults measure around 38–43 centimetres (15–17 in). Males weigh at 580–735 grams (1.279–1.620 lb), while females weigh 650–740 grams (1.43–1.63 lb). Both sexes are intricately speckled white on the belly, flanks, and undertail coverts with white streaks on the wing coverts and rump, plus a white terminal band at the tail tip. Males have sooty brownish-grey feathers with a ruff around its neck and a black bib outlined in white with red skin above each eye. Females are more pale brown in color and lack the distinct facial markings of the male.

== Distribution and habitat ==
The Siberian grouse is distributed across eastern Siberia and the Russian Far East in the federal districts of Primorsky Krai, Khabarovsk Krai, Amur Oblast, and Sakhalin. A small population formerly inhabited the far northeast of China, where they are probably now extinct. They prefer moist, shady coniferous forests (especially in the winter) with a dense understory of moss and berry bushes, including stands of Ezo spruce, Korean pine, Khingan fir, and Dahurian larch, as well as mixed forest communities interspersed with open glades. Grouse may switch to cranberry and other berries and leaves of Vaccinium, Empetrum, Rubus and other shrubs in their diet during the summer and fall months. They gather in small flocks numbering up to 10–11 birds in the autumn, especially when made up of females and subadult males. In winter, they roost in snow burrows, though they also sleep high in trees during milder weather.

== Behaviour ==
Males assert their territory every spring by flicking their tails and erecting their neck feathers. Other courtship performances include a soft trilling coo ascending in pitch, followed by jumping and twirling twice while wing-clapping midair. Females may visit the display grounds between late April and mid May. Males older than 3 years do most of the copulations. The nest is built as a simple sink on the dirt floor lined with sticks and pine needles. 6-12 tawny-buff eggs with dark rusty spots laid in the nest are incubated for about 23–24 days.

== Conservation ==
The Siberian grouse is classified as Globally Near Threatened by BirdLife International due to loss of habitat caused by increased illegal exploitation of forests, overhunting, and forest fires. Thus, the Siberian grouse can serve as an indicator species that reflects the health of the Amur forests in Far East Russia. Conservation efforts are essential to reduce the risk to this species.

== Ecology ==
The Siberian grouse's ecology and life history is being further examined with captive individuals at the Karasuk Research Station by the Institute of Systematics & Ecology of Animals in Novosibirsk, Russia. Their breeding program seeks to learn in-depth about their natural behaviors and analyze threats to its natural ranges and propagate affected populations by releasing acclimated birds whenever necessary. Siberian grouse are generally quite difficult game birds to raise in a captive environment since their requirements are often complicated. Several attempts have been made to maintain and successfully breed this arboreal grouse elsewhere in Russia and abroad. One cause is their vulnerability to disease that affects wild and domestic birds alike, given how frigid the Russian taiga drops to during winter inhibits germs and pathogens from reproducing. Their dietary needs are inherently specialized as well, considering they naturally eat conifer needles and berries for most of the year. They also seem to show little to no fear of human presence. Instead of flying off when approached, they tend to freeze and/or resume normal activity even when approached a close distance.

Researcher Alexander Andreev observed the effect of predation pressure on Siberian spruce grouse in the winter, especially by owls, as they tend to avoid landing on snow at daytime and resorted to other safety precautions to minimize as much noise when moving. Andreev also found that the Siberian grouse dispersed when night falls to avoid predation and flocked during the day to socialize.
