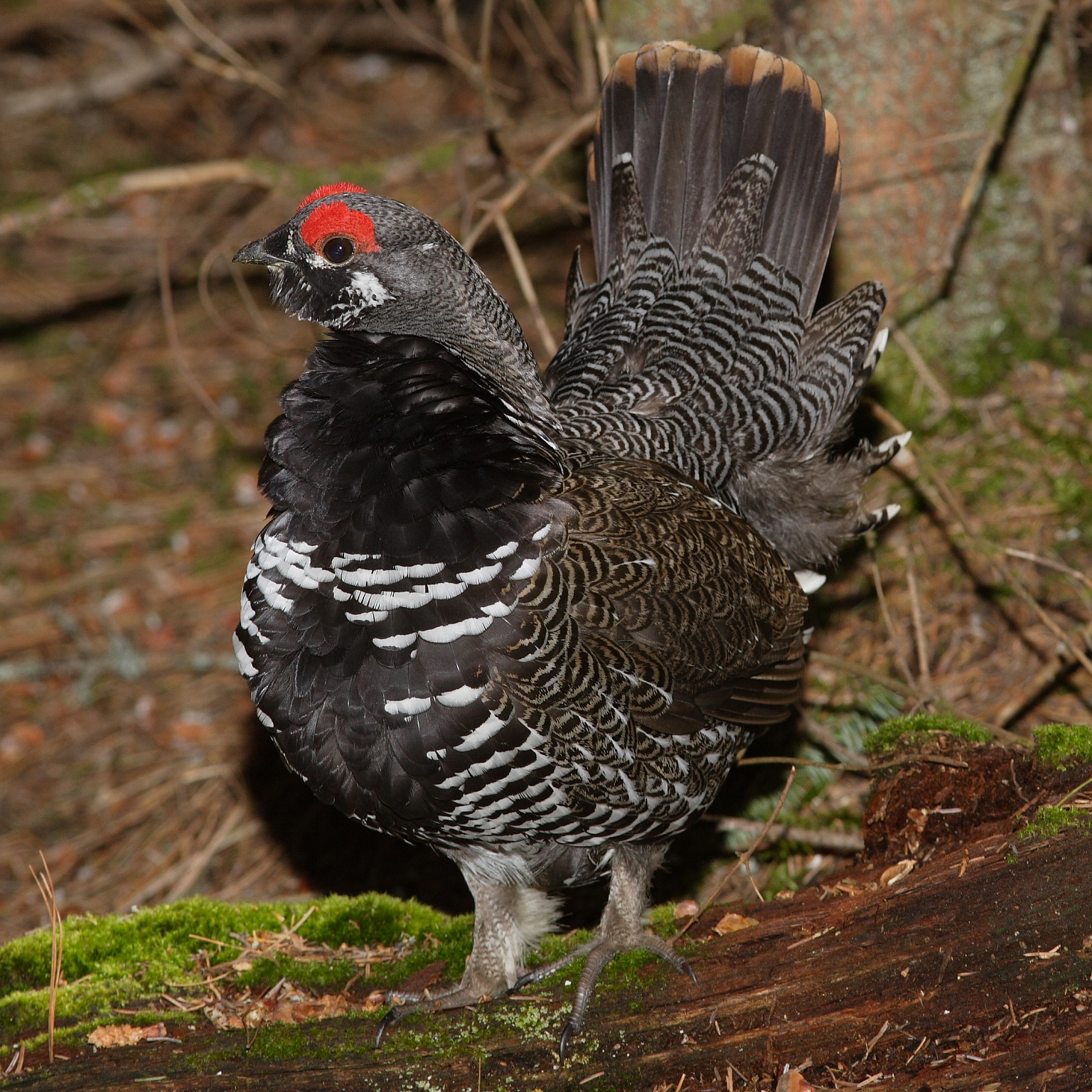
- Male of the nominate subspecies
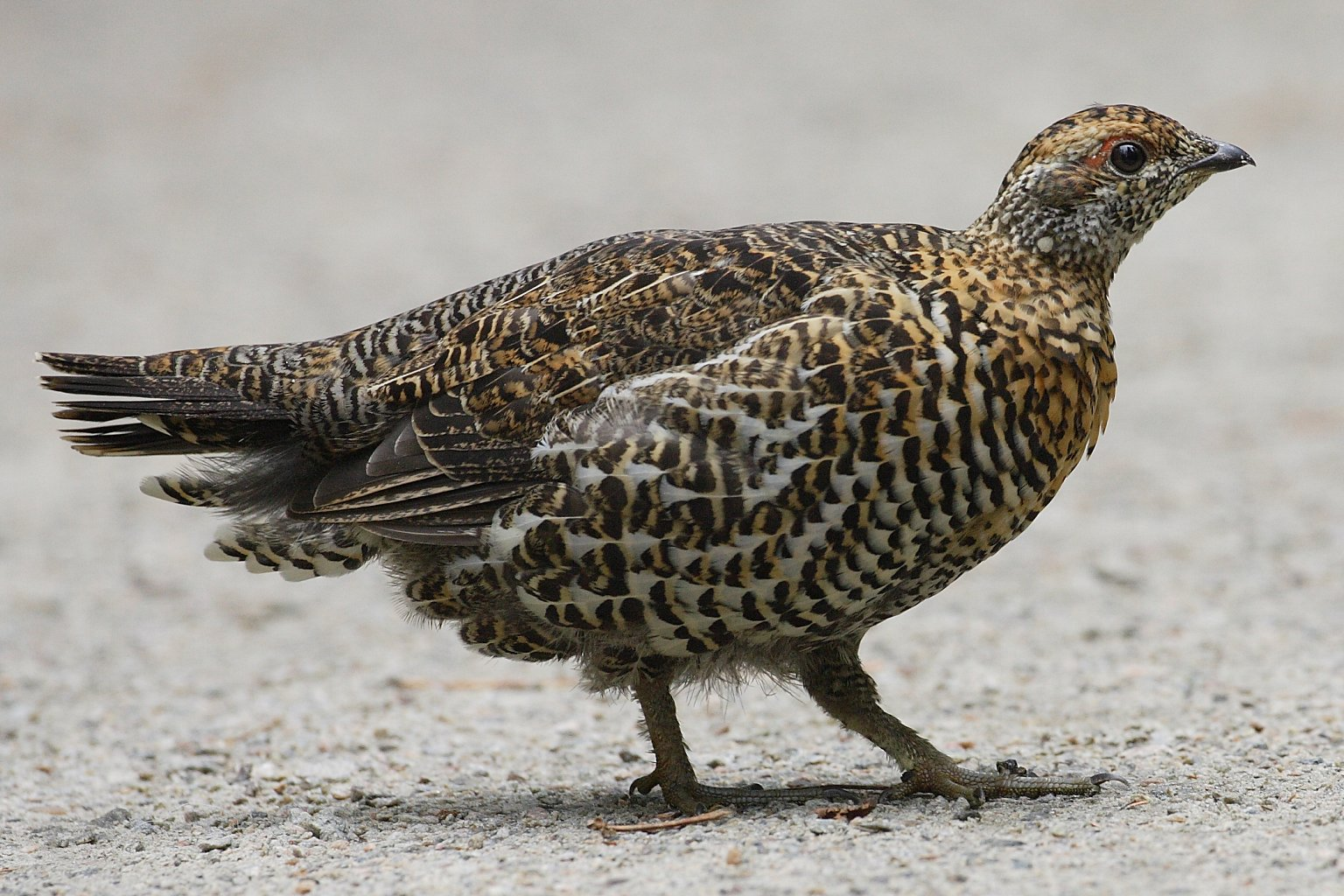
- Female

Conservation status
- Least Concern (IUCN 3.1)

- Secure (NatureServe)

Scientific classification
- Kingdom: Animalia
- Phylum: Chordata
- Class: Aves
- Order: Galliformes
- Family: Phasianidae
- Tribe: Tetraonini
- Genus: Canachites; Stejneger, 1885
- Species: C. canadensis

Binomial name
- Canachites canadensis (Linnaeus, 1758)

Subspecies
- C. c. atratus (Grinnell, 1910); C. c. canace (Linnaeus, 1766); C. c. canadensis (Linnaeus, 1758); C. c. franklinii (Douglas, 1829); C. c. isleibi (Dickerman & Gustafson, 1996); C. c. osgoodi (Bishop, 1900)
- Distribution map of the spruce grouse

Synonyms
- Dendragapus canadensis (Linnaeus, 1758); Tetrao canadensis Linnaeus, 1758; Falcipennis canadensis

= Spruce grouse =

Species of bird

The spruce grouse (Canachites canadensis), also known as Canada grouse, spruce hen or fool hen, is a medium-sized grouse closely associated with the coniferous boreal forests or taiga of North America. It is the only member of the genus Canachites.

It is one of the most arboreal grouse species, fairly well adapted to perching and moving about in trees. When approached by a predator, it relies on camouflage and immobility to an amazing degree; for example, letting people approach within a few feet before finally taking flight.

== Taxonomy ==
In 1747, the English naturalist George Edwards included an illustration and a description of a female spruce grouse in the second volume of his A Natural History of Uncommon Birds. He used the English name "The Brown and Spotted Heathcock". Edwards based his hand-coloured etching on a preserved specimen that had been sent to him in London from the Hudson Bay in Canada by a Mr Light. Edwards was later sent what he assumed was a specimen of the male bird by James Isham. In 1750, he included the male bird in the third volume of his book under the English name "The Black and Spotted Heathcock". When in 1758, the Swedish naturalist Carl Linnaeus updated his Systema Naturae for the tenth edition, he placed the spruce grouse with other grouse in the genus Tetrao. Linnaeus included a brief description, coined the binomial name Tetrao canadensis and cited Edwards' work. The spruce grouse is now the only species placed in the genus Canachites that was introduced in 1885 by the zoologist Leonhard Stejneger. The genus name Canachites combines the name Canace from Greek mythology with the Ancient Greek -itēs meaning "resembling".

In the first half of the 20th century, spruce grouse were classified as two separate species in the genus Canachites: spruce grouse (C. canadensis) and Franklin's grouse (C. franklinii), a position reinstated by Birdlife International in 2014. However, as of early 2021, the International Ornithological Congress (IOC), the American Ornithological Society, and the Clements taxonomy retain Franklin's grouse as a subspecies of spruce grouse.

The species was later moved to the genus Dendragapus, congeneric with the blue grouse with which spruce grouse often share coniferous habitats. However, spruce grouse do not have inflatable cervical sacs as in blue grouse, and the natal plumage of the two species is different. Based on its stronger resemblance to the Siberian grouse (Falcipennis falcipennis), the spruce grouse was later reclassified into the genus Falcipennis. However, taxonomic studies found this classification to be paraphyletic, with the Siberian grouse being basal to a clade containing the spruce grouse, Tetrao, and Lyrurus. Due to this, the spruce grouse was again reclassified in Canachites, bringing its taxonomy full-circle.

The spruce grouse has six recognized subspecies:

Image	Subspecies	Distribution
	C. c. atratus (Grinnell, 1910)	southern Alaska
	C. c. canadensis (Linnaeus, 1758)	central Alberta to Labrador (Canada) and Nova Scotia. Introduced in Newfoundland in 1964 and Anticosti Island in 1985–86.
	C. c. canace (Linnaeus, 1766)	southeast Canada and northeast United States
	C. c. franklinii (Douglas, 1829)	southeast Alaska to northwest Wyoming and Idaho
	C. c. isleibi (Dickerman & Gustafson, 1996)	southeast Alaska
	C. c. osgoodi (Bishop, 1900)	northern Alaska

== Description ==
Spruce grouse are 38–43 cm (15–17 in) long; males weigh 550–650 g (19–23 oz) and females 450–550 g (16–19 oz). The spruce grouse has a wingspan range of 21.5–22.6 in (55–57 cm). Races vary slightly in plumage, especially in the tail pattern and in the extent of white on the underparts, but in general adult males are mainly grey above and black below, with white spots along the side, and a red patch of bare skin over the eye called the "eyebrow comb". This red eyebrow comb, should not be confused by a similar yellow marking found on other species of grouse including, but not limited to, sharp-tailed and dusky grouse. Adult females are mottled brown (red morph) or mottled grey (grey morph) with dark and white bars on the underparts. Juveniles resemble females. Females may be confused with ruffed grouse but they have a dark tail with a pale band at the end (while the reverse is true in ruffed grouse) and they do not erect their crown feathers when alarmed the way ruffed grouse do.

Spruce grouse are among the most silent of all grouse, but they nevertheless have a number of calls used to warn of predators, to repel territorial intruders, to maintain brood cohesion, or to elicit brooding. In the subspecies franklinii, territorial males are notable for their wing-clap display. At the end of a short flight through the trees, the wings are brought together over the back so as to produce two sharp claps, about half a second apart, loud enough to be heard by the human ear 150 m (490 ft) away. These territorial displays can sometimes be elicited by similar hand clapping, and can be used to detect male territories and estimate their density. Other non-vocal sounds include soft drumming by territorial males (a sound produced by the beating wings) and a tail-swish and a whoosh produced by the tail feathers in flight.

== Distribution and habitat ==
As a specialist of the taiga, the spruce grouse is found throughout Canada. In the United States, it is present in Alaska, northern New England, the Adirondacks in New York, northern Michigan, northeastern Minnesota, northern Wisconsin and the montane coniferous forests of Montana, Idaho, Maine, Oregon, and Washington. Spruce grouse are always associated with conifer-dominated forests, be they pine, spruce, or fir. They seem to prefer young successional stands. In summer they can be found near rich understory of blueberries and other shrub, and in winter they prefer denser stands.

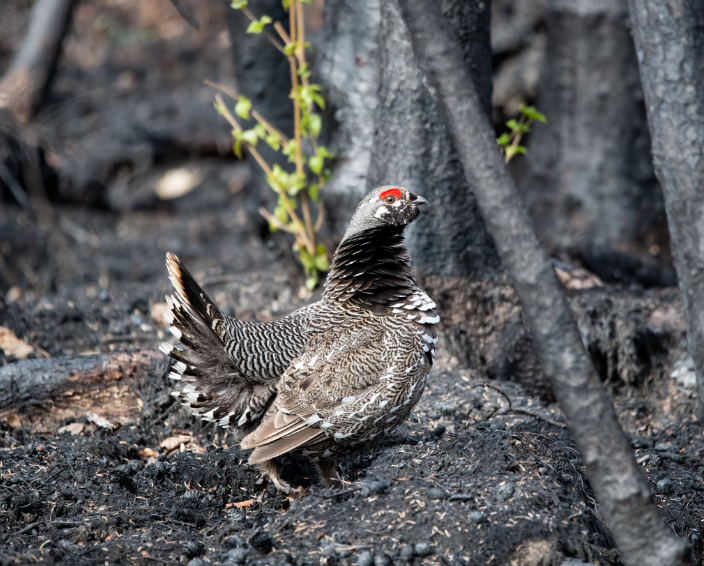
Kenai National Wildlife Refuge, Alaska

The spruce grouse is essentially a permanent resident. However, in southwestern Alberta up to 35% of females and 7% of males move several kilometers (up to 11 km (6.8 mi)) between summer breeding sites and wintering sites. Similar movements have also been documented in Alaska and New Brunswick (Canada).

== Behaviour and ecology ==
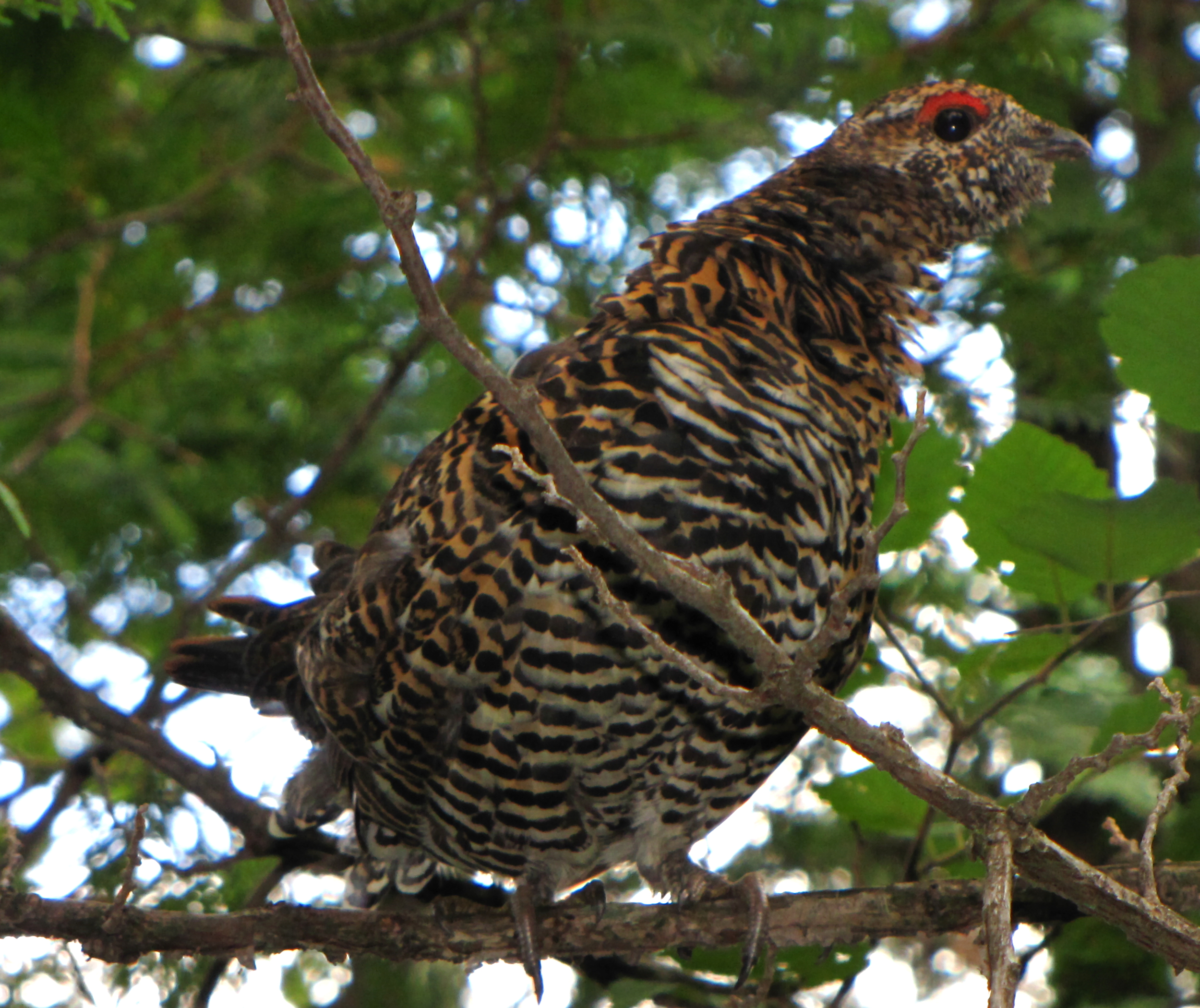
Immature male "hiding" in tree, Matagamasi Lake, Temagami, Ontario

This species prefers to walk on the ground or along tree limbs rather than fly. Like other grouse, in the fall they grow "snow shoes" (short lateral extensions, or pectinations) on their toes. This increases the surface area of the toes and helps support the bird on snow and probably to grip branches as well. The pectinations are shed in the spring. Flights are usually over short distances, most commonly from the ground to a tree nearby, or vice versa. Flight can be rapid but no actual measures of velocity have been made.

== Breeding ==
Males are promiscuous; they disperse and advertise a territory that is visited by females for mating. Females are solely responsible for the rest of the reproductive effort though males have been known to stay with young chicks and seem to aid in keeping the brood together. For a nest, they scratch a depression in the ground in a bush or under a low-lying coniferous branch or fallen tree, away from other females and from the males' territories. The nest is lined with grasses, leaves, and a few feathers. Nesting season is from early May to early July. Up to 10 eggs may be laid, the usual number being 4–7. Laying rate is 1 egg every 1.4 days. Eggs are about 40 mm (1.6 in) and are tawny olive or buff, marked with blotches of brown. Incubation begins with the last egg laid and lasts about 24 days. Young are about 15 g (0.5 oz) at hatching and they are precocial; they walk out of the nest as soon as they are dry (about 8 h after hatching). They are capable of fluttering up from the ground at 1 week of age. The brood stays together and is accompanied by the hen, who broods them all night and frequently during the day until the young are 3–5 weeks old. Brooding behaviour of the female seems to be initiated by specific calls from the chicks when they are cold. At 70–100 days of age, chicks tend to leave the group and become independent. Females breed only once a year. Most females first breed at 1 year of age, but about half the males delay establishing a territory until 2 years. The species' lifespan appears to be about 5–6 years in the wild, though one study in Southwestern Alberta has found two males and one female that lived to be at least 13 years old.

=== Food and feeding ===
The staple winter food is conifer needles, clipped directly from the tree, preferably the midcrown of pines though other conifers such as spruce are exploited as well. Spruce needles are high in calcium and their increase in use by females in Spring may be related to egg production In summer the birds can forage on the ground, eating berries, green plants such as blueberry leaves, fungi, and some insects. In winter, when only needles are consumed, the caeca (dead-end extensions of the intestines) and ventriculus (gizzard) increase in size to support digestion. The crop is also well developed: up to 45 cc of needles (about 10% of body mass) can be stored in the crop at the end of the day, to be digested over the duration of the night fast. Like other birds, spruce grouse consume clay, grit or small stones to help their gizzard break down food. Chicks under 1 week old feed on insects and other arthropods, then switch to berries and fungi until the fall, when they start feeding on needles. Birds captured while on the winter diet have been maintained several months without loss of weight, on only pine needles and grit and clay taken from where they were seen consuming it.

== Predators ==
Spruce grouse eggs are taken by American red squirrels, gray foxes, weasels, and possibly corvids. Adults can fall prey to various hawks and owls, red foxes, American and Pacific martens, wolves, cougars, and coyotes.

== Relationship with humans ==
This species is commonly hunted. Annual bag figures in the late 1970s were about 188,000 birds in the US and about 360,000 in Canada. Even though it has been deemed of Least Concern by IUCN, in the United States this bird is a protected species according to many northern states' hunting rules. The spruce grouse is available for hunting in Alaska from August 10 - March 31 and in some regions through May 15 according to the Alaska Department of Fish and Game. Conversely, the spruce grouse is considered threatened in its southern range - being listed as Endangered in New York and Vermont, and Critically Imperiled in Wisconsin according to NatureServe. In New York, the population is estimated at 175–315 individuals, with declines recorded since the 1970s. However, a management plan has been developed.

== Gallery ==
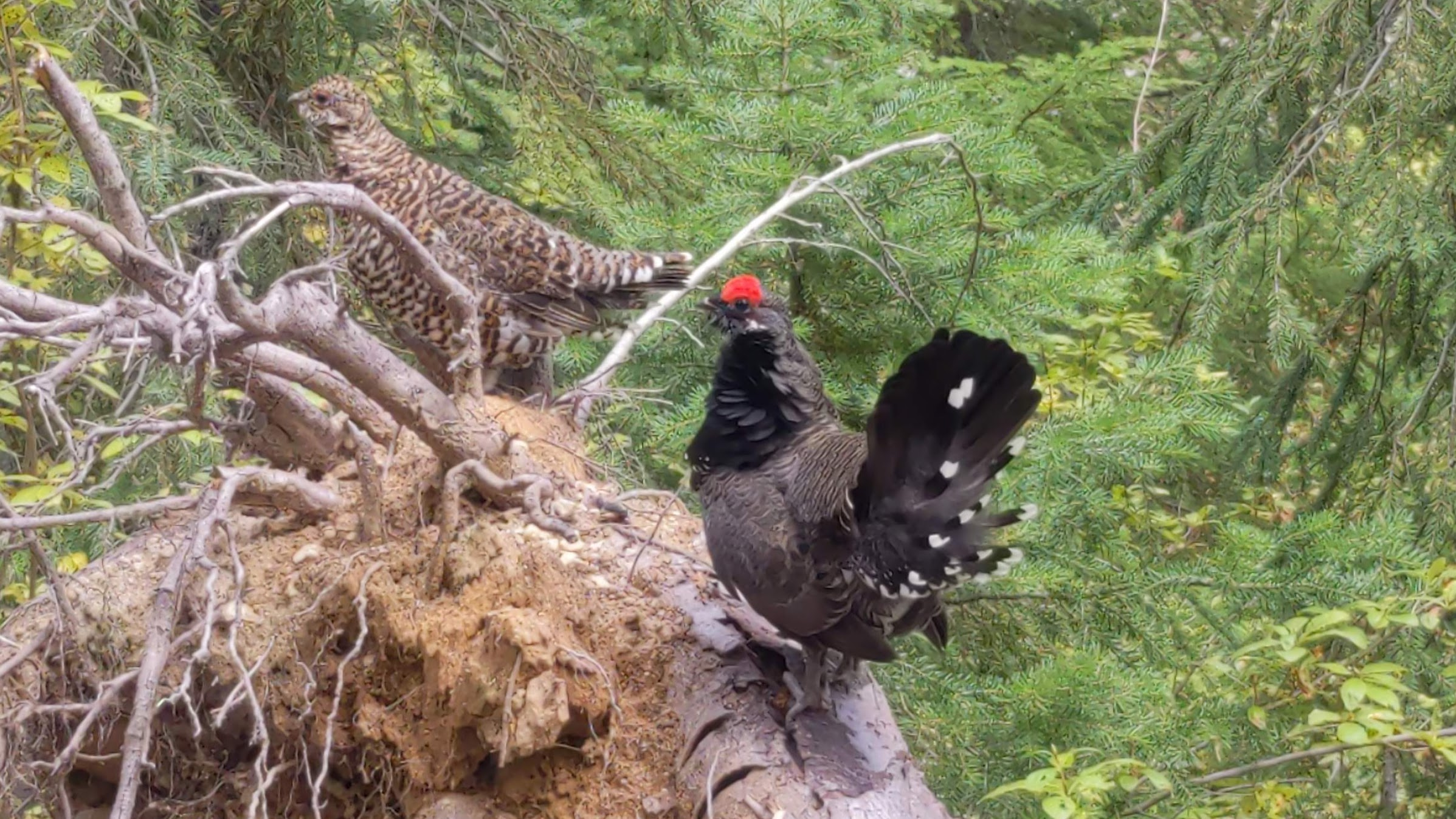
Male and female spruce grouse, Nelson, British Columbia

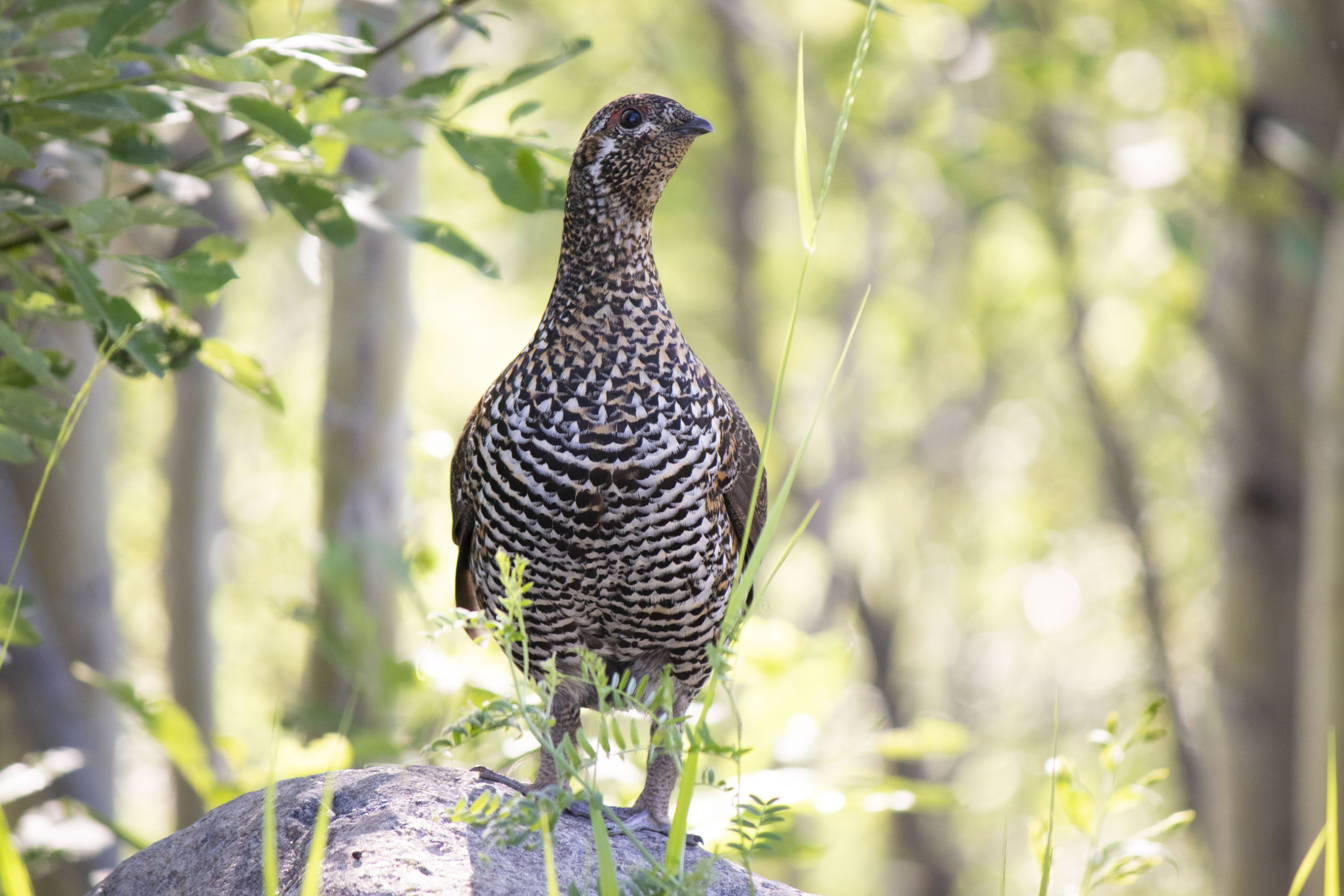
Female spruce grouse, Grands-Jardins National Park, Québec

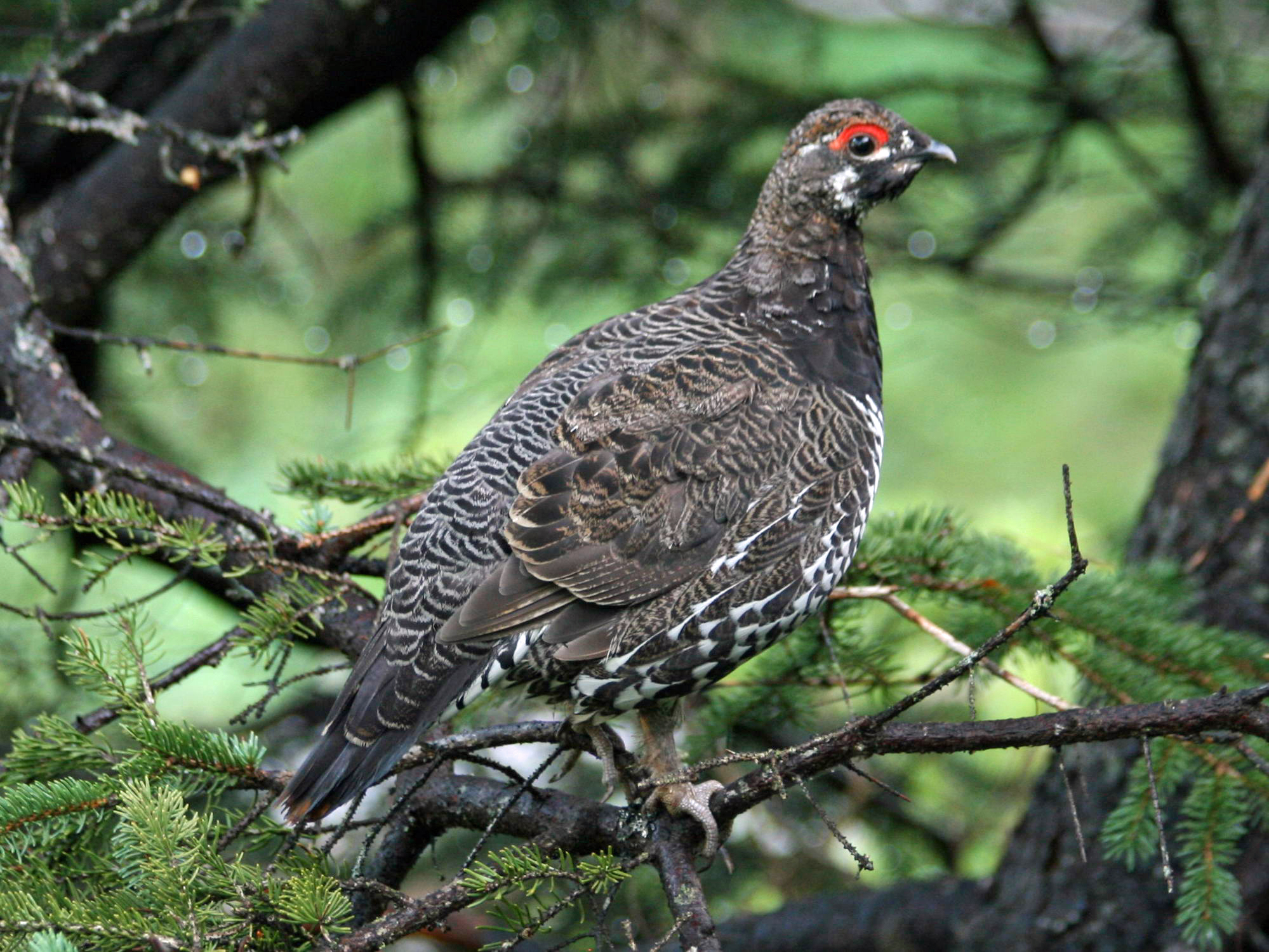
Male, Acadia National Park, Maine

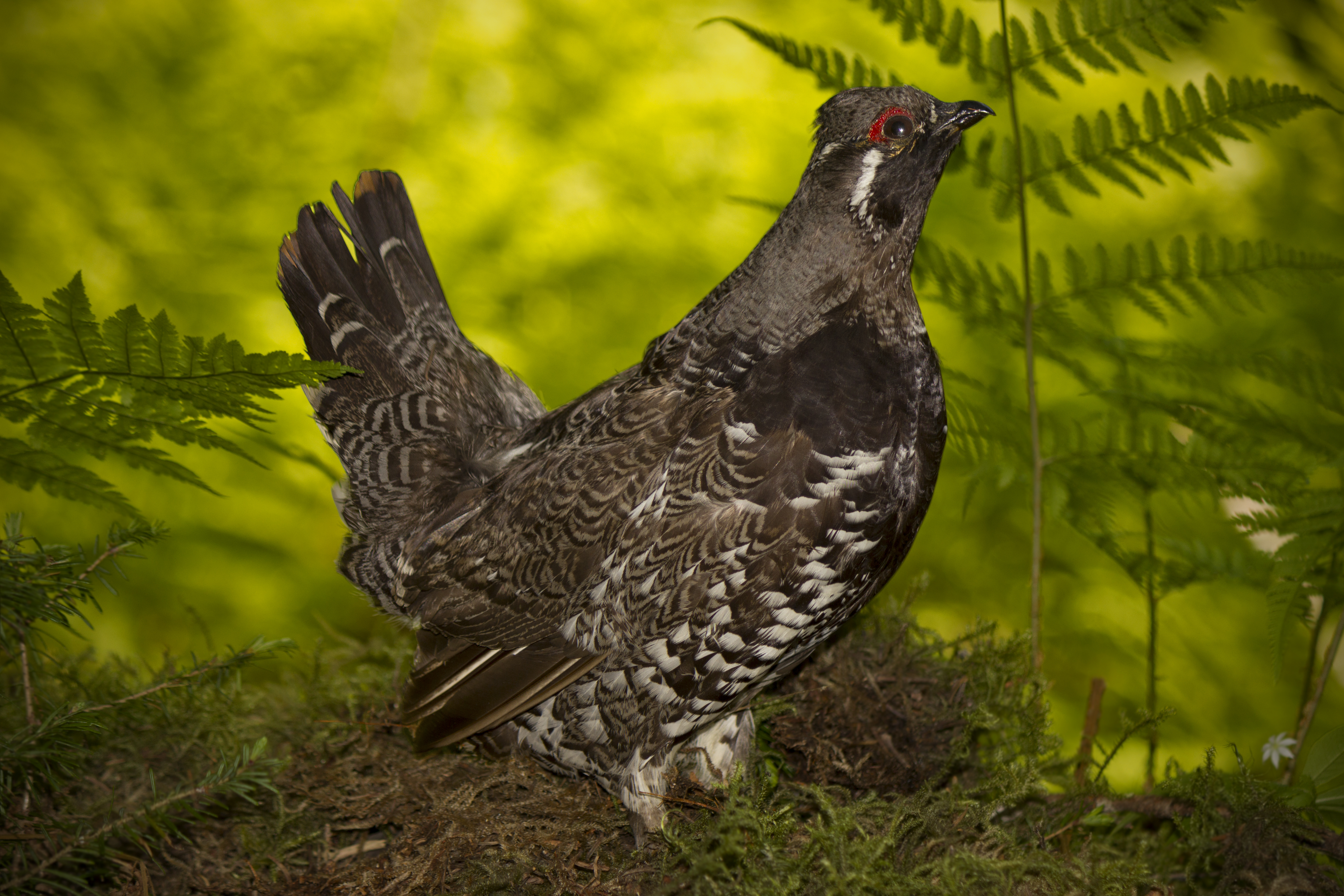
Male spruce grouse during mating season

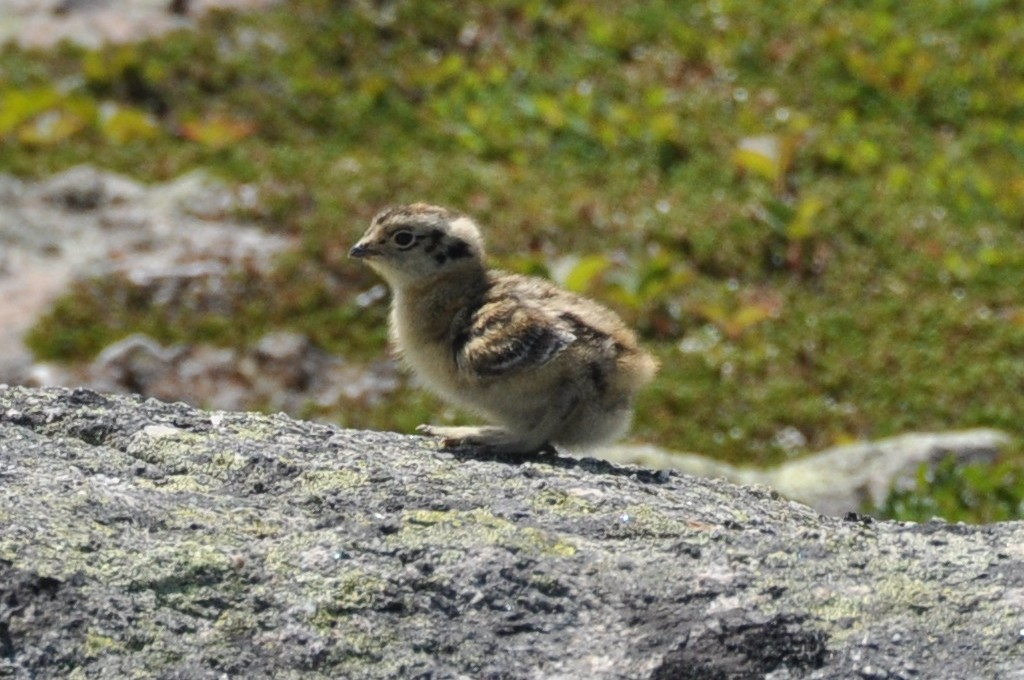
A chick, Gros Morne National Park, Newfoundland
