= Quercus of Denmark =

- Quercus alba
- Quercus aliena
- Quercus bicolor
- Quercus borealis (rubra)
- Quercus borealis var. maxima (rubra)
- Quercus cerris
- Quercus coccinea
- Quercus dentata
- Quercus ellipsoidalis
- Quercus faginea
- Quercus frainetto
- Quercus glandulifera
- Quercus ilicifolia
- Quercus ilex, Hardines Zone: 7 - 10, not hardy.
- Quercus imbricaria
- Quercus liaotungensis
- Quercus macranthera
- Quercus macrocarpa
- Quercus mongolica
- Quercus mongolica var. grosseserrata
- Quercus montana (prinus)
- Quercus palustris
- Quercus petraea
- Quercus petraea f. mespilifolia
- Quercus petraea x robur (robur var. puberula)
- Quercus pontica
- Quercus pubescens
- Quercus robur
- Quercus robur 'Filicifolia'
- Quercus robur f. fastigiata
- Quercus robur var. tardissima
- Quercus rubra
- Quercus x schochiana
- Quercus shumardii
- Quercus suber, Hardines Zone: 8 - 10, not hardy.
- Quercus x turneri 'Pseudoturneri'
- Quercus velutina

== See also ==
- Trees of the world
- List of Quercus species
