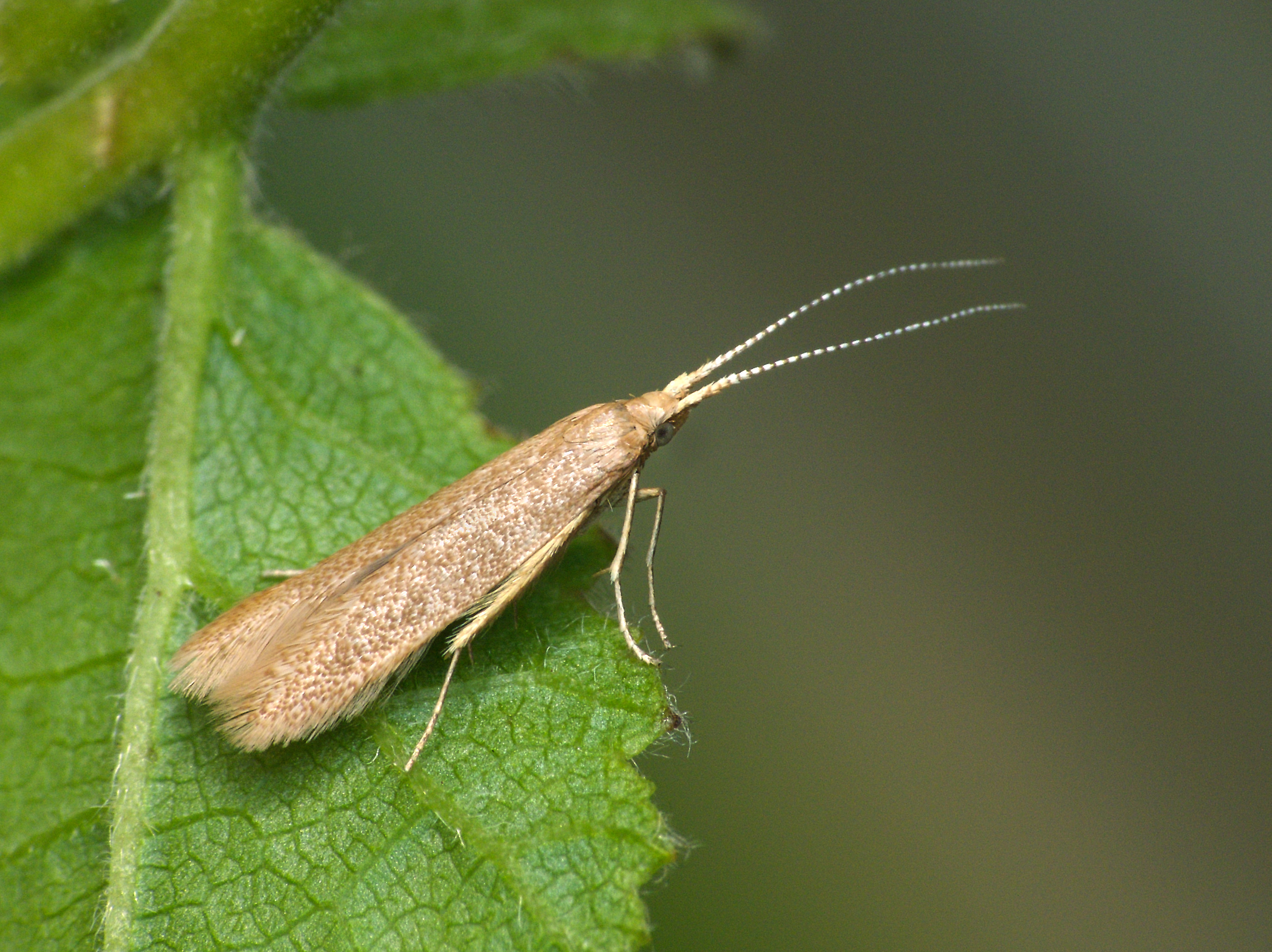

Scientific classification
- Kingdom: Animalia
- Phylum: Arthropoda
- Class: Insecta
- Order: Lepidoptera
- Family: Coleophoridae
- Genus: Coleophora
- Species: C. lutipennella

Binomial name
- Coleophora lutipennella (Zeller, 1838)

Synonyms
- Ornix lutipennella Zeller, 1838

= Coleophora lutipennella =

Species of moth

Coleophora lutipennella is a moth of the family Coleophoridae. It is found in most of Europe, except the Mediterranean islands.

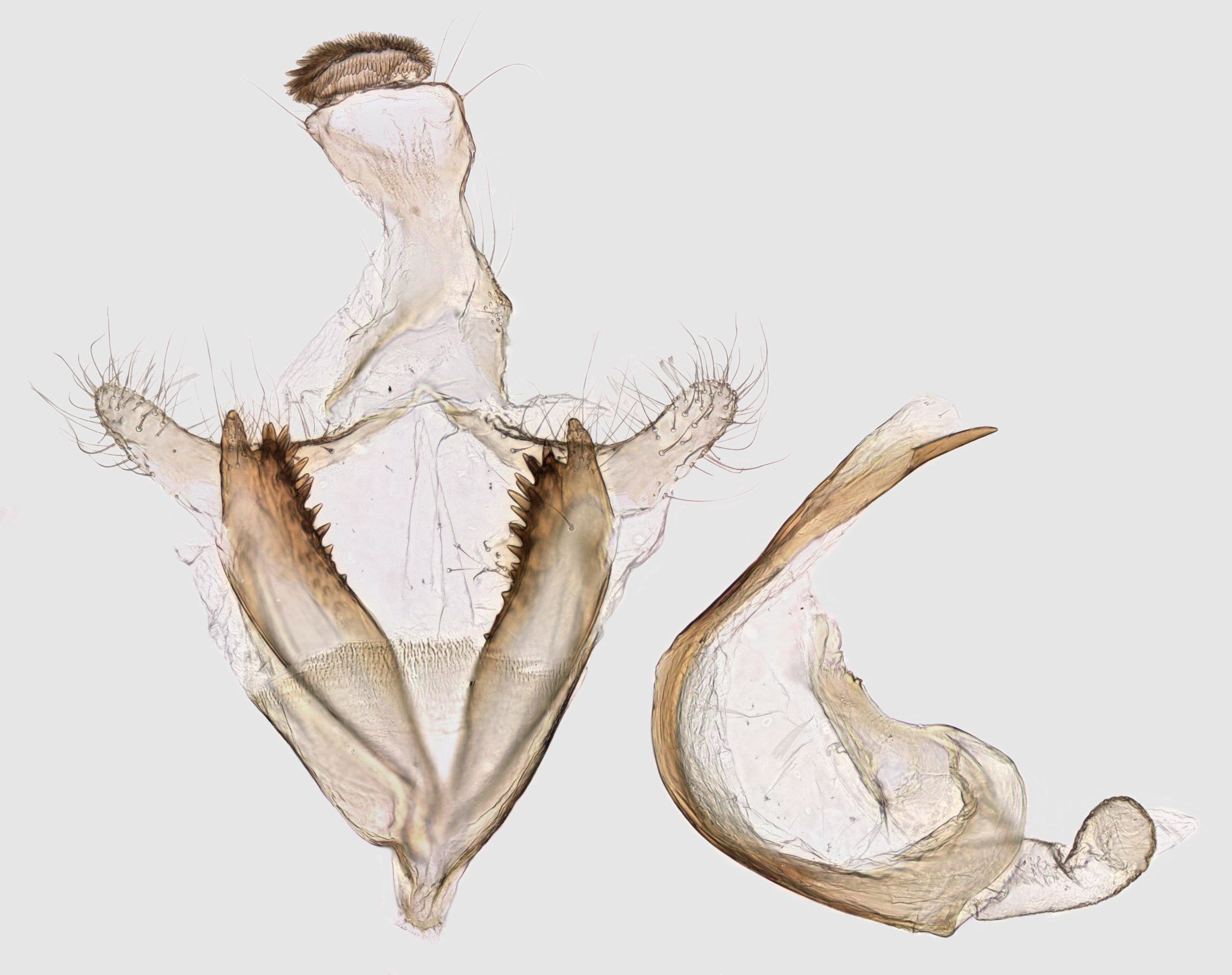
Genitalia preparation

The wingspan is 10–12 mm (0.39–0.47 in). Head pale yellow-ochreous. Antennae white, ringed with fuscous or dark fuscous. basal joint whitish-ochreous. Forewings light yellow-ochreous. Hindwings grey. Only reliably identified by dissection and microscopic examination of the genitalia.

The moth flies from July to August depending on the location.

The larvae feed on Castanea sativa, Quercus macranthera, Quercus petraea, Quercus pontica, Quercus pubescens and Quercus robur. Full-grown larvae can be found in early June.
