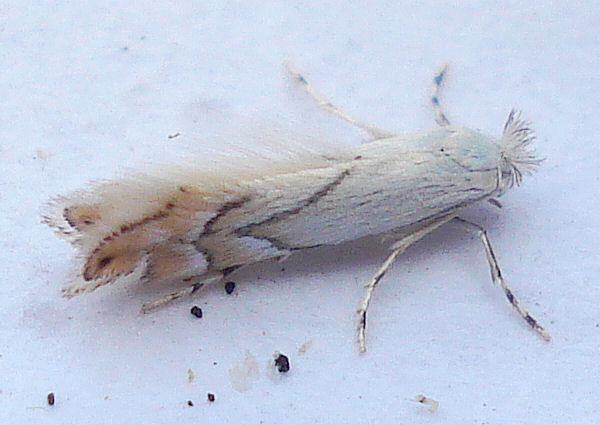

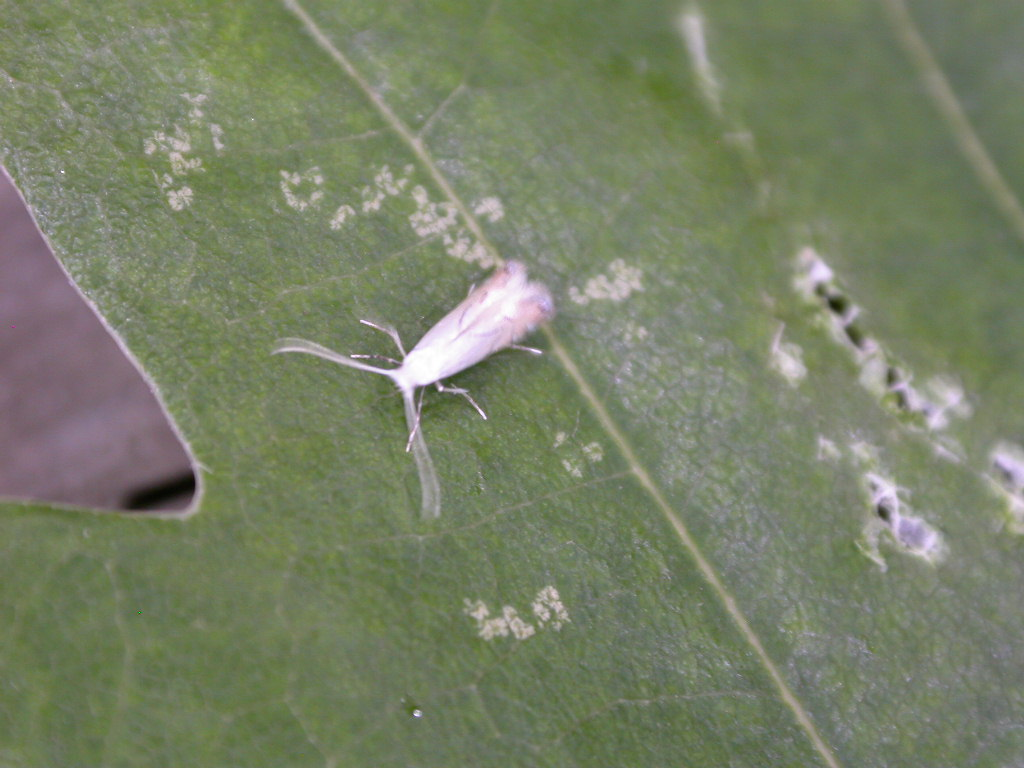

Scientific classification
- Kingdom: Animalia
- Phylum: Arthropoda
- Class: Insecta
- Order: Lepidoptera
- Family: Gracillariidae
- Genus: Phyllonorycter
- Species: P. harrisella

Binomial name
- Phyllonorycter harrisella (Linnaeus, 1761)

Synonyms
- Phalaena harrisella Linnaeus, 1761; Tinea cramerella Fabricius, 1777

= Phyllonorycter harrisella =

Species of moth

Phyllonorycter harrisella is a moth of the family Gracillariidae. It is found in all of Europe, except the Balkan Peninsula and the Mediterranean islands.

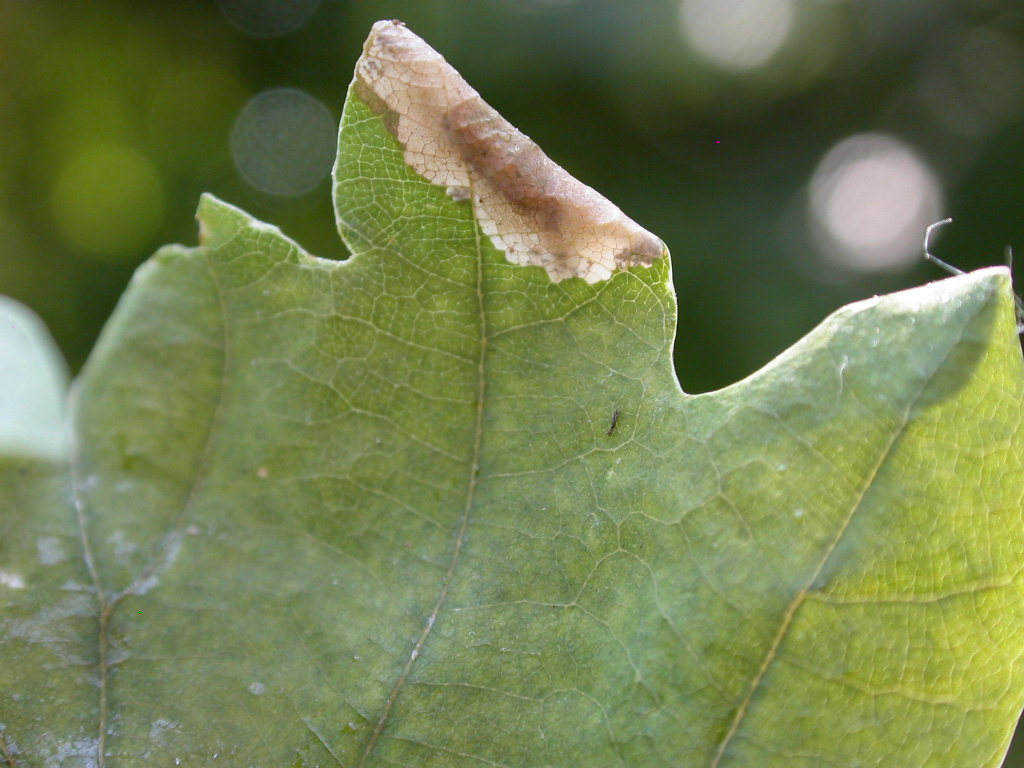
Larval mine

The wingspan is 7–9 mm. The forewings are shining white; three posterior costal and two dorsal dark fuscous strigulae, anteriorly more or less margined suffusedly with brownish-ochreous, apex brownish-ochreous, enclosing a round black apical dot; an ill-defined dark hook in apical cilia. Hindwings are light grey.

Adults are on wing in May and June and again in autumn.

The larvae feed on Quercus cerris, Quercus cerris austriaca, Quercus dalechampii, Quercus faginea, Quercus frainetto, Quercus macranthera, Quercus petraea, Quercus pontica, Quercus pubescens and Quercus robur. They mine the leaves of their host plant.
