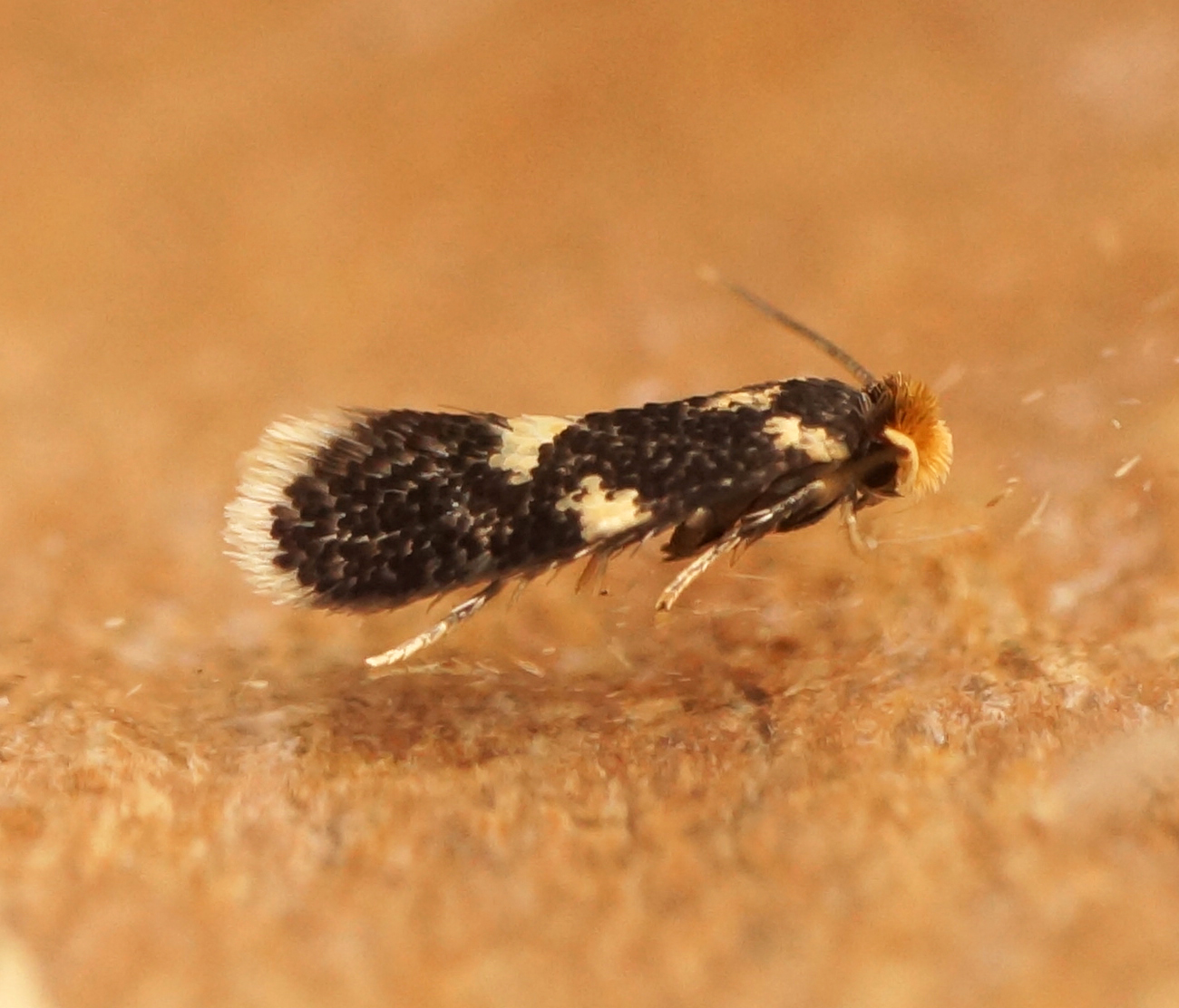
- Imago Hertfordshire, England

Scientific classification
- Kingdom: Animalia
- Phylum: Arthropoda
- Clade: Pancrustacea
- Class: Insecta
- Order: Lepidoptera
- Family: Nepticulidae
- Genus: Ectoedemia
- Species: E. subbimaculella

Binomial name
- Ectoedemia subbimaculella (Haworth, 1828)

Synonyms
- Tinea subbimaculella Haworth, 1828; Dechtiria subbimaculella (Haworth, 1828); Stigmella subbimaculella (Haworth, 1828); Nepticula bistrimaculella Heyden, 1861; Nepticula cursoriella Zeller, 1848; Microsetia nigrociliella Stephens, 1834

= Ectoedemia subbimaculella =

Species of moth

Ectoedemia subbimaculella is a moth of the family Nepticulidae. It is found in most of Europe, east to Smolensk, Kaluganorth and the Volga and Ural regions of Russia.

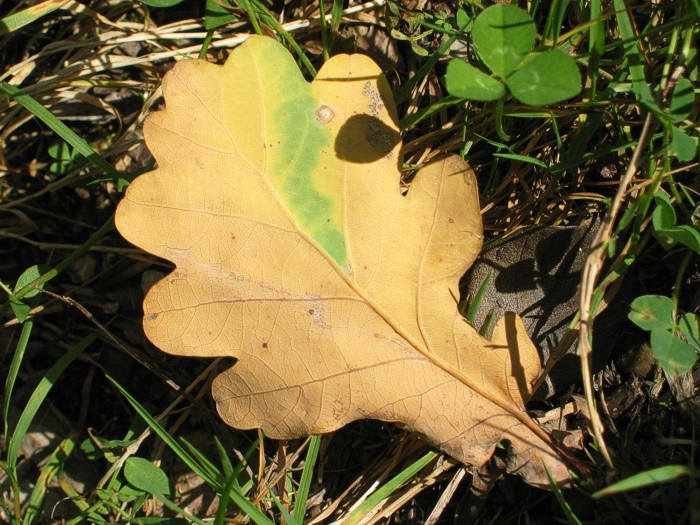
Damage ("green island"

The wingspan is 5–6 mm. The head is orange. The antennal eyecaps are whitish. The forewings are dark fuscous with an ochreous-whitish small basal spot, another on middle of the costa, and a larger triangular spot on the dorsum before tornus; tips of apical cilia whitish. The hindwings are grey.

The larvae feed on Castanea sativa, Quercus frainetto, Quercus macranthera, Quercus petraea, Quercus pubescens, Quercus pyrenaica, Quercus robur and Quercus rubra. They mine the leaves of their host plant. Pupation takes place outside of the mine. Adults fly in June and July.
