= Quercus furuhjelmi =

Quercus furuhjelmi Temporal range: Paleogene

Scientific classification
- Kingdom: Plantae
- Clade: Embryophytes
- Clade: Tracheophytes
- Clade: Spermatophytes
- Clade: Angiosperms
- Clade: Eudicots
- Clade: Rosids
- Order: Fagales
- Family: Fagaceae
- Genus: Quercus
- Species: †Q. furuhjelmi

Binomial name
- †Quercus furuhjelmi Heer

Species of oak tree

Quercus furuhjelmi was a type of 'brown (or chestnut) oak' that lived in the Paleogene period. It is only known by its fossil remains, which have been found in Kazakhstan and Alaska.

According to some authorities (Trelease, 1924), they were related to the white oaks, subgenus Lepidobalanus (or Leucobalanus) while others relate them to the Heterobalanus of East Asia.

Chestnut oaks are a seemingly polyphyletic group. The chestnut oaks of East Asia (for example Q. crispula Blume) have been placed in the subgenus Heterobalanus, while a chestnut oak from western North America – Q. sadleriana R.Br.ter – is considered by some to be a member of the Leucobalanus subgenus and by others to be in the Heterobalanus subgenus.

Comparison of the brown leaves of the chestnut tree and the brown oaks does not indicate any fundamental distinction between the foliage of these groups, although some species of heterobalanus have some pointed teeth, which are absent in Leucobalanus. Some specimens of Q. furuhjelmi also had some sharp teeth, which suggests that this species was probably related to Heterobalanus.
