= Quercus sadleriana =

Conservation status
- Near Threatened (IUCN 3.1)

- Unranked (NatureServe)

Scientific classification
- Kingdom: Plantae
- Clade: Tracheophytes
- Clade: Angiosperms
- Clade: Eudicots
- Clade: Rosids
- Order: Fagales
- Family: Fagaceae
- Genus: Quercus
- Subgenus: Quercus subg. Quercus
- Section: Quercus sect. Ponticae
- Species: Q. sadleriana

Binomial name
- Quercus sadleriana R.Br.ter

Species of oak tree

Quercus sadleriana is a species of oak in the family Fagaceae known by the common names Sadler's oak and deer oak. It is endemic to the Klamath–Siskiyou ecoregion in southwestern Oregon and northern California, growing at montane to subalpine elevations in the Siskiyou Mountains and Coast Range. Considered a transitional species, Q. sadleriana resprouts vigorously after fires and acts as a nurse plant for seedlings and saplings. It grows in a variety of habitats, including chaparral and conifer forests with varying degrees of canopy cover.

The plant is a stout evergreen shrub that grows from a rhizome, often producing large clonal colonies. Though it appears primarily to reproduce vegetatively, the plant also produces acorns that are eaten both by people and animals. Its large, toothed leaves are distinctive and often compared to chestnut leaves.

Because of its unusual morphology, its relationships to other oak species were poorly understood until genetic data revealed that its sister species is the Eurasian species Q. pontica and that the two species diverged from other oak lineages approximately 40 million years ago. Despite being distantly related to other North American oaks, Q. sadleriana produces natural, interspecific hybrids with Quercus garryana var. breweri and possibly with Quercus vacciniifolia.

Its narrow geographic distribution led the International Union for Conservation of Nature to classify the species as near threatened, but the species has a relatively high level of recruitment and low degrees of habitat fragmentation. The primary conservation threat to Q. sadleriana is wildfire suppression. Regular, low-intensity fires help maintain suitable habitat, while prolonged fire suppression leads to fuel accumulation and increased risks of severe wildfires.

== Description ==
Quercus sadleriana is an evergreen shrub growing 1–3 m (3–10 ft) tall from a root network with rhizomes. Plants often form large clonal colonies, spreading by rhizomes and by tip-rooting. The bark is smooth and gray, and twigs are red to brown, 3–4 mm (0.1–0.2 in) in diameter, and smooth, although there are sometimes sparse hairs around the buds. Buds are ovoid with acute or rounded tips, have loose scales, are yellow or tan in color with silky, gray pubescence, and measure 8–10 mm (0.3–0.4 in) long.

An evergreen, Q. sadleriana has leaves that persist for 2–3 years. The leaves are 7–14 cm (3–6 in) long and 3.5–8 cm (1–3 in) wide, with rounded bases, acute tips, and serrate edges, and have been compared to chestnut leaves. The teeth along the leaf edges are shallow and have sharp tips (called mucros) that curve toward the apex of the leaf. Each side of the midrib has 10–15 secondary veins that are prominent on both leaf faces. The upper leaf faces are dark green, glabrous, and shiny, while the lower leaf faces are light green, waxy, and sparsely covered in small, stellate hairs. Each leaf is held on a petiole 15–25 mm (0.6–1 in) long, with persistent stipules where it attaches to the stem.

Quercus sadleriana with developing acorns

Like other oaks, Q. sadleriana is monoecious, with plants producing separate male and female inflorescences that flower from April to June. The male flowers typically have six stamens and are borne on catkins that emerge with each year's new leaves. The pollen grains are covered in small bumps.

The fruit is an acorn, maturing in its first year, likely around mid-October. The acorns are solitary or held in pairs on very small stalks, with hemispheric or funnel-shaped cups and spherical or egg-shaped nuts. Gray scales with reddish tips and a sometimes bumpy texture cover the cup, which is 7–9 mm (0.3–0.4 in) deep and 10–18 mm (0.4–0.7 in) wide. The nuts are light brown, 15–20 mm (0.6–0.8 in) long, and 10–15 mm (0.4–0.6 in) wide.

== Taxonomy ==
A botanical illustration of Q. sadleriana from 1895.

The botanist Robert Brown described Quercus sadleriana in 1871, naming it after the botanist John Sadler. Brown observed the species in 1865 near Sailor's Diggins, Oregon (now named Waldo), close to the California border. He noted that the species was distinctive, with leaves similar to those of Notholithocarpus densiflorus but markedly differently shaped acorn cups. In his original description, Brown noted that Danish botanist Anders Ørsted considered the acorn cups dissimilar to those of all other North American oaks, identifying the Himalayan species Quercus griffithii as the most similar morphologically.

The evolutionary relationships between Q. sadleriana and other oaks were clarified by molecular data that supported a revised classification of oaks published in 2017. The revised classification also analyzed pollen morphology, a characteristic previously overlooked by oak taxonomists. Q. sadleriana is now placed in section Ponticae, a clade containing only one other living species, Quercus pontica, which is native to the mountains of northeastern Turkey and western Georgia. Further phylogenetic analyses estimate that Ponticae diverged from sections Quercus (white oaks) and Virentes (southern live oaks) roughly 40 million years ago, shortly after the divergence of Protobalanus, and that Q. sadleriana and Q. pontica diverged from one another around 15 million years ago.

== Distribution and habitat ==
Quercus sadleriana growing in the understory of a conifer forest in Josephine County, Oregon

Quercus sadleriana has a relatively narrow distribution, endemic to the Klamath–Siskiyou ecoregion. It occurs in the Siskiyou Mountains and Coast Range in southwestern Oregon and northwestern California where it grows at elevations of 600–2,200 m (2,000–7,200 ft). It often grows on steep, rocky topography, especially south- and west-facing slopes but also in forest understories. These sites, especially at higher elevations, experience long winters with abundant precipitation and snow but are very dry in the summer, often with little to no precipitation. The plant grows on a variety of acidic soil types, including serpentine soils with high levels of magnesium.

In these montane regions, Q. sadleriana grows in a range of habitats, including conifer forests with continuous canopy cover and exposed chaparral or scrub communities. It is considered a transitional species, regenerating vigorously after fire and thriving for 10–50 years before the conifer forest canopy closes. Associated chaparral species include Garrya fremontii, Holodiscus discolor, Prunus emarginata, Quercus vacciniifolia, Quercus garryana var. breweri, Notholithocarpus densiflorus var. echinoides, and several species of Arctostaphylos, Ceanothus, and Chrysolepis. In montane and subalpine forests, it grows in forests with Pinus lambertiana, Picea breweriana, Abies procera and other conifers, and on high-elevation rocky slopes, it is found with Callitropsis nootkatensis.

== Ecology ==
=== Reproduction ===
Quercus sadleriana reproduces both sexually and asexually. Botanist Gilbert Muth noted in 1980 that plants produced acorns abundantly but that he had difficulty germinating the acorns. Muth concluded that the species primarily reproduces vegetatively by rhizomes and layering, where stems that touch the ground root to produce clones. A 2018 report by ecologist Alex Seglias found very few viable acorns that year. Seglias proposed several possible explanations: Q. sadleriana may allocate more resources to vegetative reproduction than to sexual reproduction, it may produce viable acorns only in mast years, she may have missed the peak fruiting period, or conditions may not have been suitable in 2018 for acorn production.

=== Hybridization ===
A Quercus garryana × sadleriana hybrid observed in Josephine County, Oregon, growing on serpentine soil

Despite diverging from other North American oaks roughly 40 million years ago, genetic evidence suggests that significant gene flow between Q. sadleriana and members of section Quercus occurred as recently as 2.8–4.5 million years ago. Today, Q. sadleriana is known to hybridize with Q. garryana var. breweri. These hybrids can vary widely in morphology but often have leaves with 6–7 obtuse lobes 20–30% of their widths, multiple spreading trunks (like Q. sadleriana), and densely pubescent twig and velvety leaf hairs (like Q. garryana var. breweri).

In 2020 and 2024, at least two possible hybrids between Q. sadleriana and Q. vacciniifolia (belonging to section Protobalanus) were identified in Curry County, Oregon. The morphology of the terminal buds, leaf dimensions, sub-antrorse teeth along the leaf margins, and acorns are intermediate between the two putative parent species. The status of these possible hybrid plants requires further study.

=== Interactions with other species ===
Q. sadleriana acts as a nurse plant, protecting other young plants in the understory. Its acorns are also an important food source for wildlife, including small mammals, bears, and deer, which may be the origin of its common name, "deer oak".

Multiple species of cynipid wasps induce galls on Q. sadleriana leaves. In particular, Neuroterus sadlerensis was the first gall wasp reported on Q. sadleriana and is specific to that host. The wasp causes the midrib to swell near the base of the leaf and reduces the growth of the leaf blade. The galls can be observed in July, with adult wasps emerging by the end of the month.

== Conservation ==
Little is known about conservation threats to Quercus sadleriana, and population trends are poorly understood. The International Union for Conservation of Nature lists the species as near threatened, largely due to its narrow geographic range, and NatureServe has not yet assessed the species' status as of November, 2026. A 2019 conservation assessment found that the species has a relatively low level of vulnerability, largely owing to a large global population of more than 10,000 individuals, relatively high levels of recruitment, and low levels of habitat fragmentation.

Quercus sadleriana growing in a burned area in the Siskiyou Mountains.

Because periodic, low-intensity fires are important for maintaining open Q. sadleriana habitat, wildfire suppression has been identified as the primary threat to the species. When natural fire regimes are interrupted, understory vegetation becomes denser, and more combustible material accumulates. This increases the risk of infrequent, more severe fires that are too intense for Quercus sadleriana to survive.

Because Q. sadleriana grows at high elevations mostly within national forests, human impacts from development and logging are relatively low. The species is common in previously logged areas. Invasive species also pose a lesser threat to the high-elevation habitats of Q. sadleriana than to lower-elevation habitats within the Klamath–Siskiyou region.

There are several ex situ collections of Q. sadleriana, almost all originating from populations in Oregon, representing the northern part of the species' range. Increasing the genetic diversity of ex situ collections has been identified as a possible conservation strategy for the plant. In particular, conserving the genetic diversity of high-elevation populations may be important as climate change shifts the species' elevational range upward.

== Uses ==
The acorn is edible and sweet enough to be eaten raw. The Karuk people peel the acorns and roast them in baskets over hot coals, producing a food called tamiuru.
