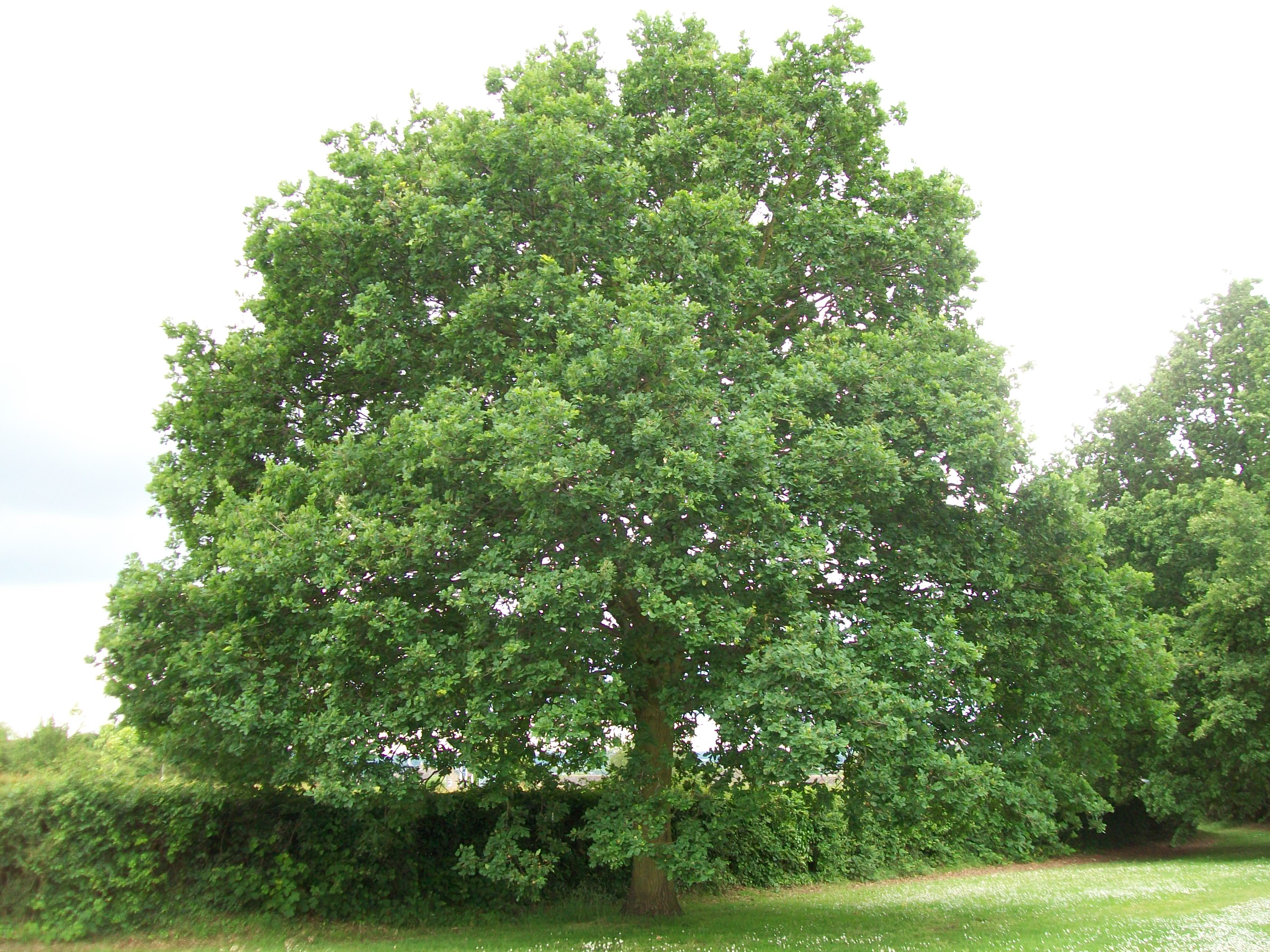
- Quercus robur (type species) growing in England

Scientific classification
- Kingdom: Plantae
- Clade: Tracheophytes
- Clade: Angiosperms
- Clade: Eudicots
- Clade: Rosids
- Order: Fagales
- Family: Fagaceae
- Genus: Quercus
- Subgenus: Quercus subg. Quercus

Sections
- Quercus sect. Lobatae Loudon; Quercus sect. Ponticae Stef.; Quercus sect. Protobalanus (Trelease) O.Schwarz; Quercus sect. Quercus; Quercus sect. Virentes Loudon

= Quercus subg. Quercus =

Subgenus of Oak trees

Quercus subgenus Quercus is one of the two subgenera into which the genus Quercus was divided in a 2017 classification (the other being subgenus Cerris). It contains about 190 species divided among five sections. It may be called the New World clade or the high-latitude clade; most species are native to the Americas, the others being found in Eurasia and northernmost North Africa.

== Description ==
Members of subgenus Quercus are distinguished from members of subgenus Cerris by few morphological features, their separation being largely determined by molecular phylogenetic evidence. All are trees or shrubs bearing acorn-like fruit in which a cup covers at least the base of the nut. The outer structure of the mature pollen is one feature that distinguishes the two subgenera: in subgenus Quercus, the small folds or wrinkles (rugulae) are obscured by sporopollenin, whereas in subgenus Cerris, the rugulae are visible or at most weakly obscured.

The two subgenera are also distinguished to some extent by their different distributions. Subgenus Quercus occurs mainly in the Americas, with some species native to Eurasia and North Africa, and may be called the New World clade or the high-latitude clade. Subgenus Cerris is primarily Eurasian, with a few species in North Africa, and may be called the Old World clade or the mid-latitude clade.

== Taxonomy ==
=== Phylogeny ===
The following cladogram summarizes the relationships that Denk et al. used to draw up their 2017 classification:

- Quercus
  - - subg. Quercus
      - sect. Lobatae
      - - sect. Protobalanus
        - - sect. Ponticae
          - - sect. Virentes
            - sect. Quercus
  - subg. Cerris

=== Section Lobatae ===
Quercus sect. Lobatae was established by John Claudius Loudon in 1830. The section, or part of it, has also been treated under names including Quercus sect. Rubrae Loudon and Quercus sect. Erythrobalanus Spach. It has also been treated as the subgenus Erythrobalanus and as the full genus Erythrobalanus (Spach) O.Schwarz. Its members may be called red oaks.

The perianth of the pistillate flowers has a characteristic flange-like shape. The staminate flowers have up to six stamens. The stalk connecting the perianth to the ovary is cone-shaped and often has rings. The acorns mature in two years, rarely in one year. The 'cup' (cupule) of the acorn is fused with its stalk (peduncule) forming a connective piece. Both the connective piece and the cup are covered with small triangular scales, mostly thin and membranous with broadly angled tips. The leaves typically have teeth with bristle-like extensions, or just bristles in leaves without teeth.

The section contains about 125 species native to Northern America (including Mexico), Central America, and Colombia in South America. The red oaks of Mexico are one of the groups of oaks that have most rapidly diversified into different species. Molecular evidence suggests that there are significant numbers of undescribed Quercus species in Mexico, so the number of known species in the section is likely to be an underestimate of the total diversity.

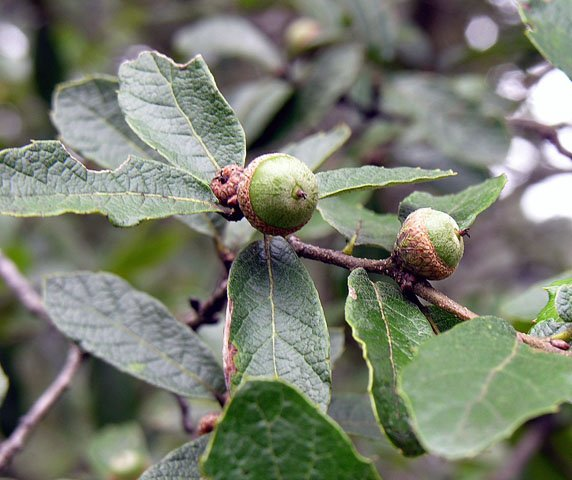
Quercus castanea leaves and acorns

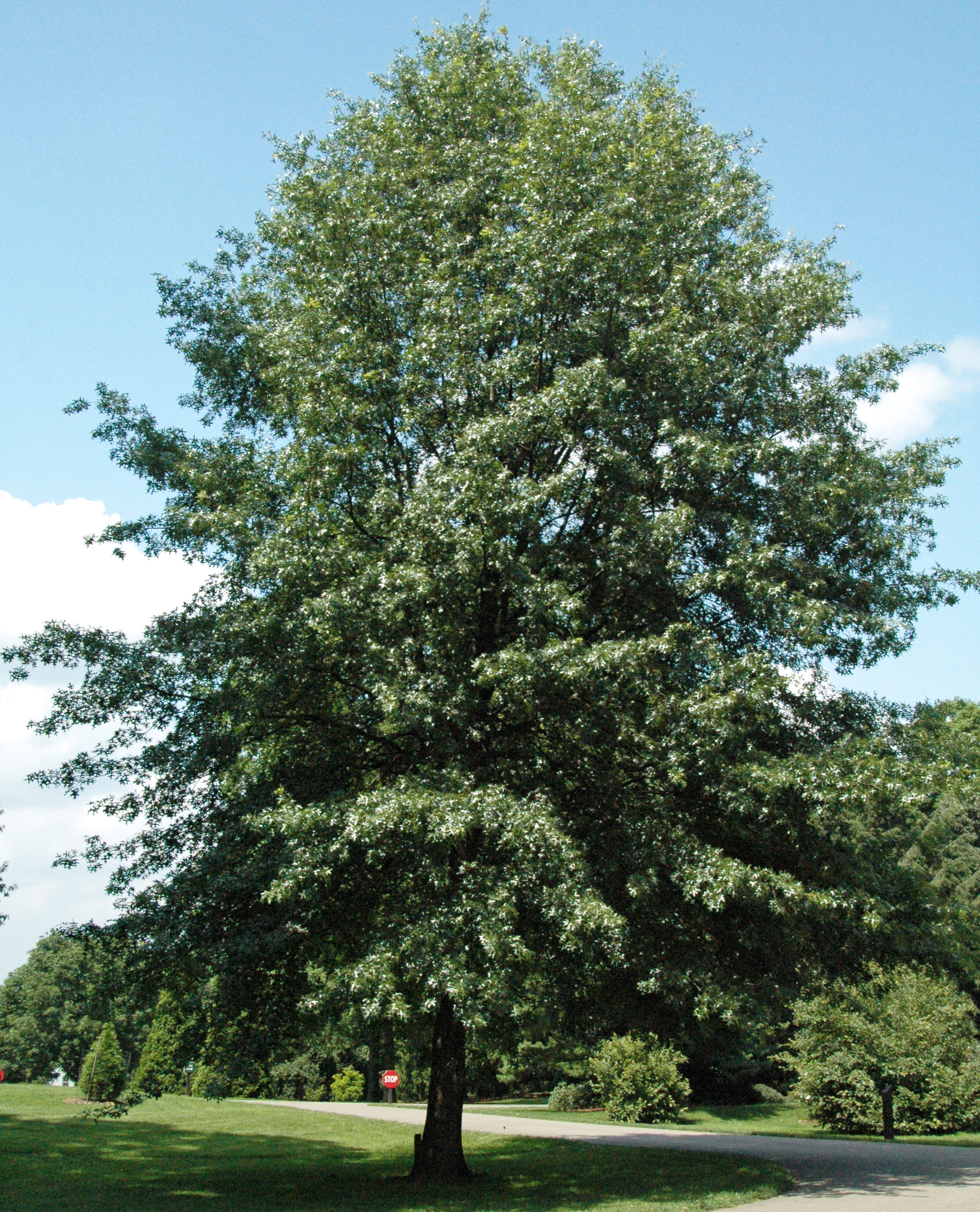
Quercus coccinea

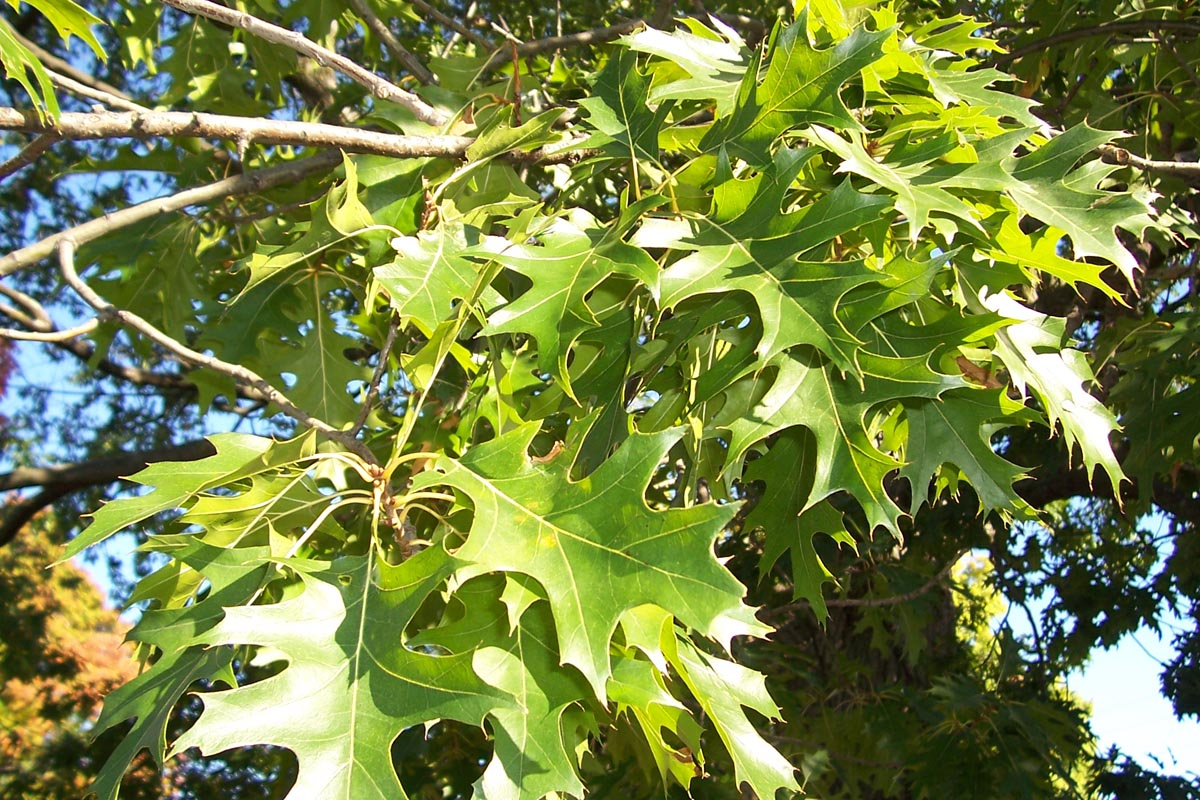
Leaves of Quercus ellipsoidalis

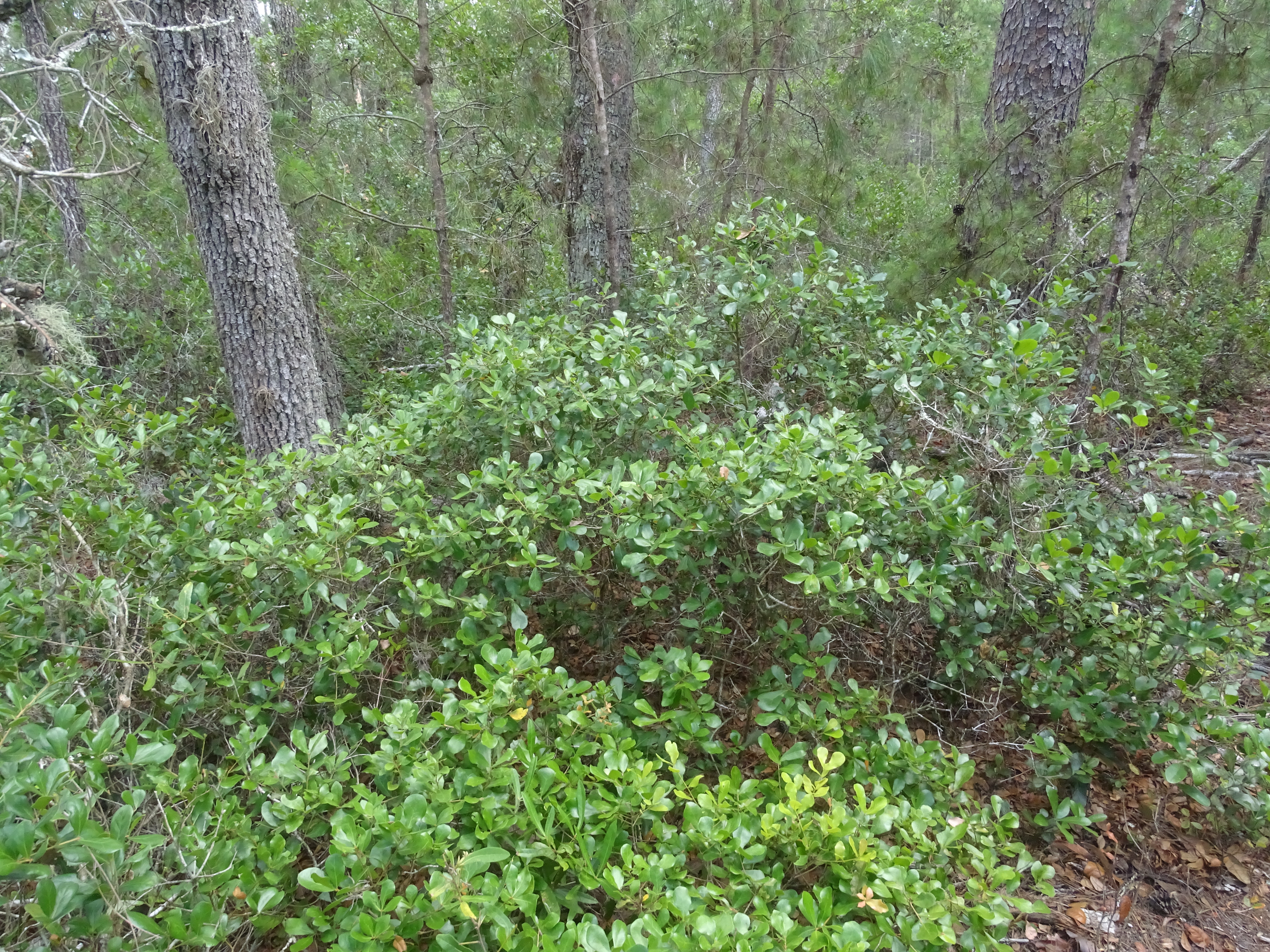
Quercus myrtifolia growing as a shrub

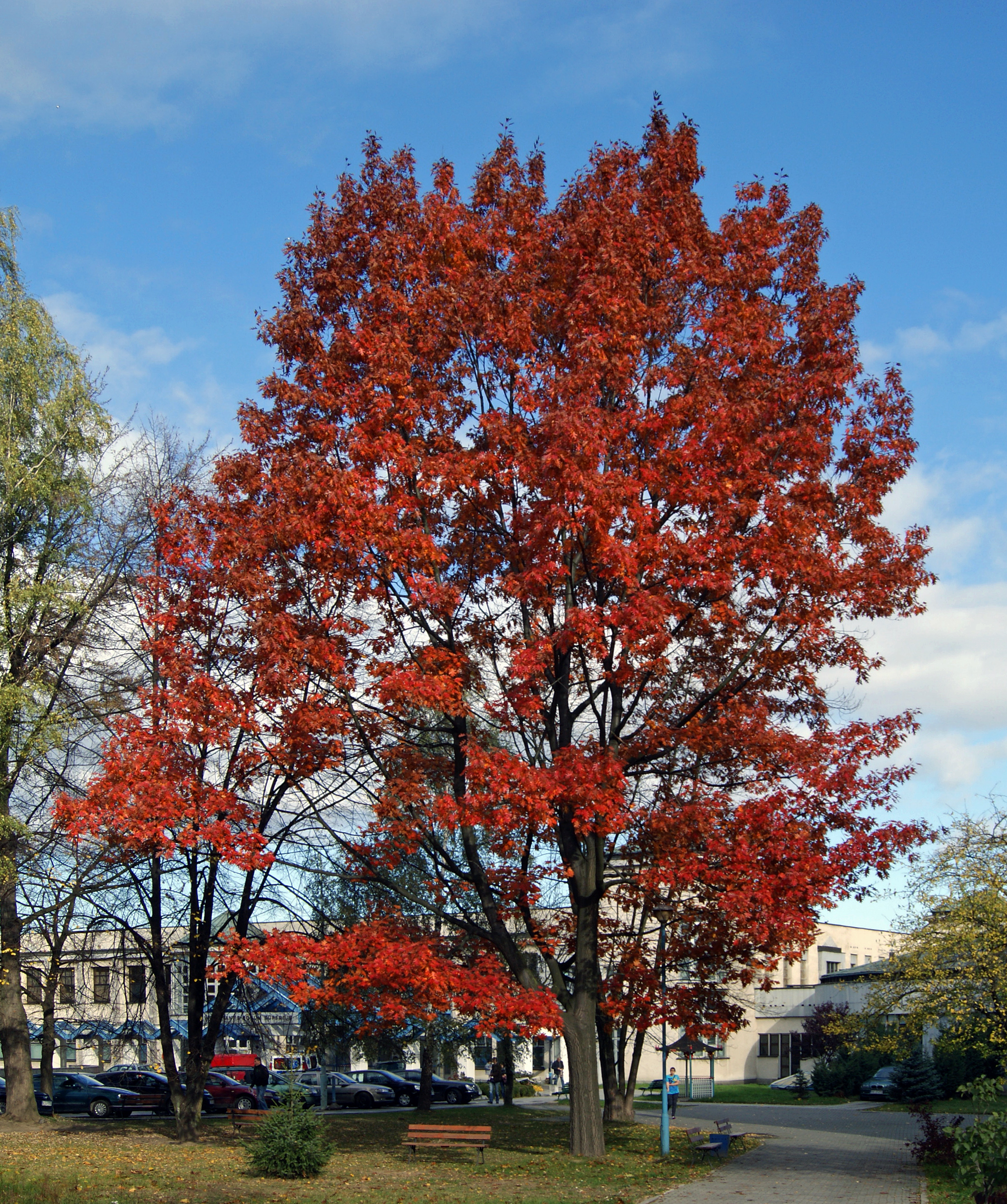
Quercus rubra in autumn (in cultivation)

=== Section Protobalanus ===
Quercus sect. Protobalanus was first established as a subgenus by William Trelease in 1922 and then later treated as a section by Otto Karl Anton Schwarz in 1936 and Aimée Antoinette Camus in 1938. (Note: At page 23, Denk et al. have only the surnames "Schwarz" and "Camus", but these are the standard botanical abbreviations for the wrong authors. "Schwarz" should be "O. Schwarz", standard abbreviation "O.Schwarz". "Camus" should be "A.Camus".)

The staminate flowers have eight to ten stamens. The pollen ornamentation has only small wrinkles or folds (verrucae). The acorns mature after two years. The cup (cupule) at the base of the acorn has triangular scales that are fused at the base and have sharp angled tips. The scales are thick and compressed into rings, often forming small bumps, that may be obscured by glandular hairs. The leaf teeth end in spines.

The section contains only five species, native to the southwestern United States and northwestern Mexico.

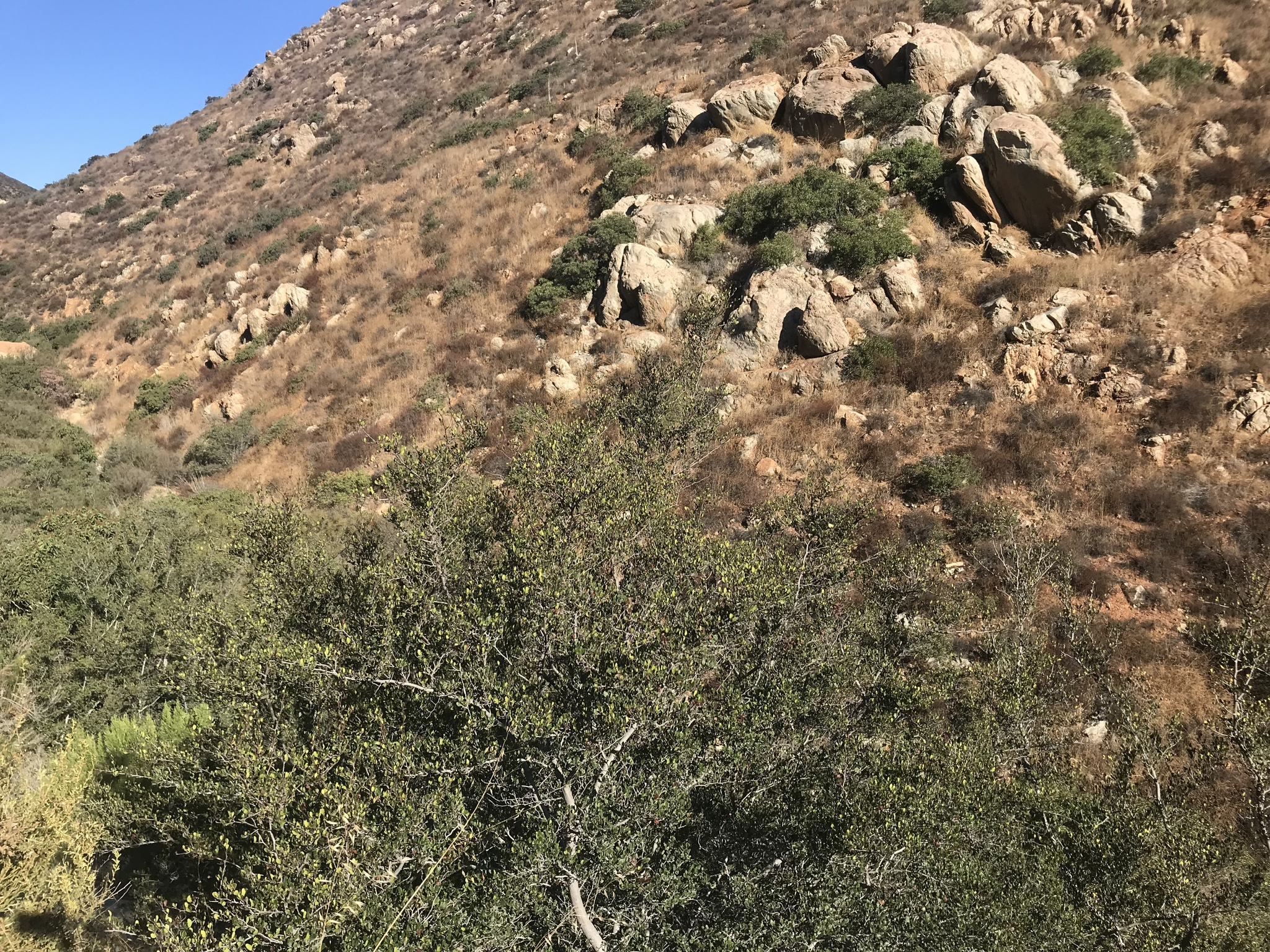
Quercus cedrosensis in habitat in Mexico

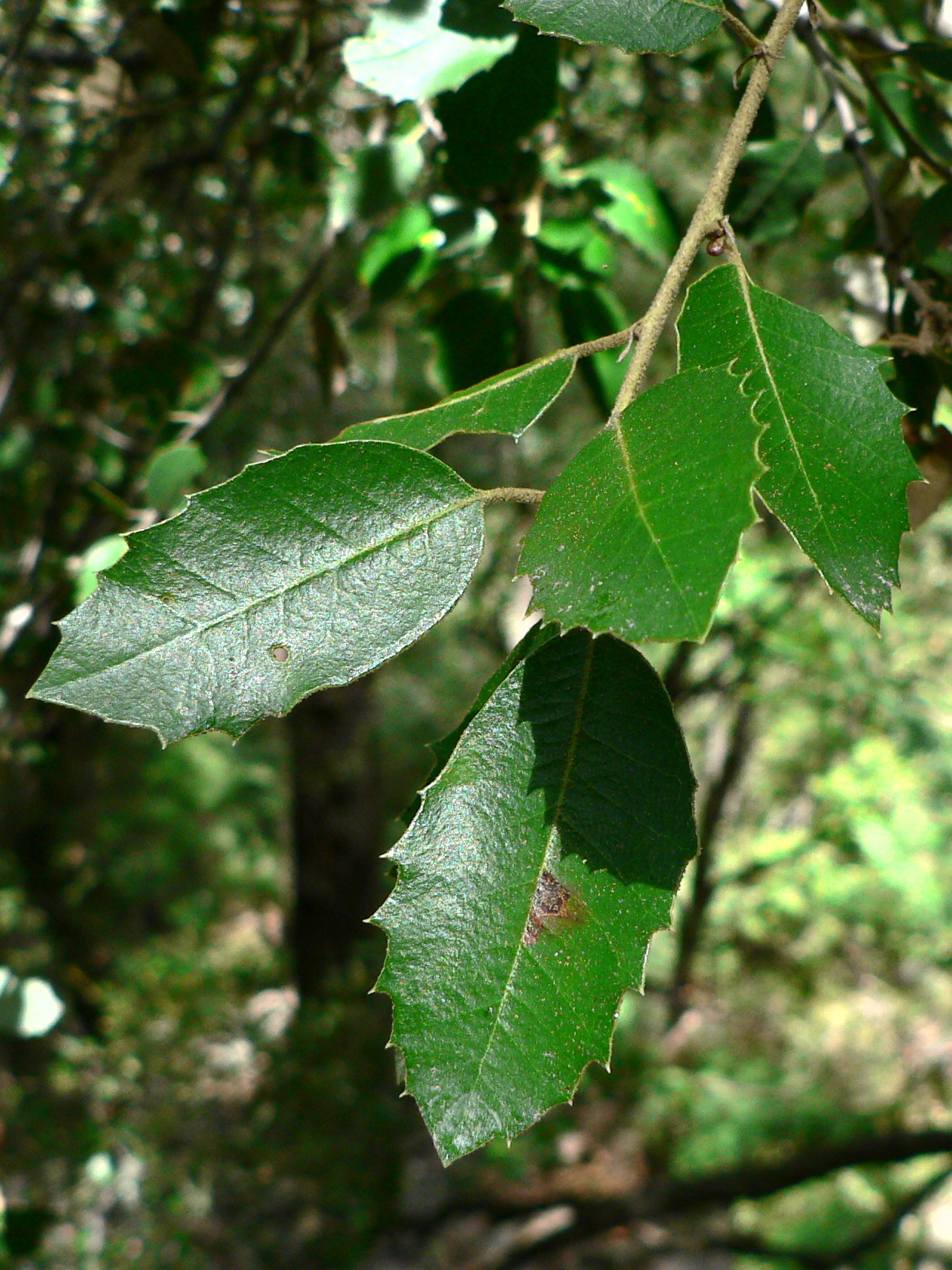
Quercus chrysolepis leaves showing spines

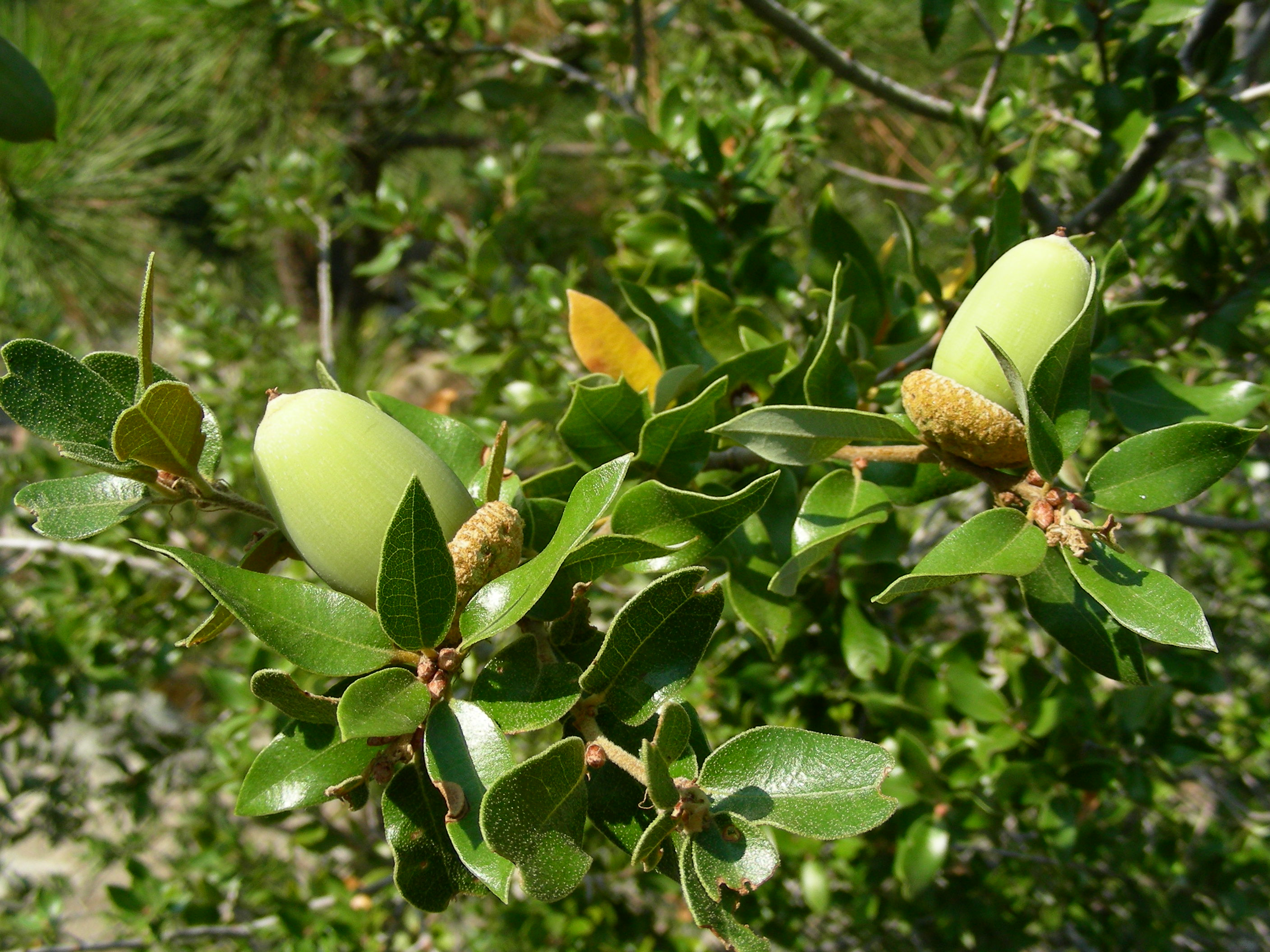
Quercus chrysolepis acorns

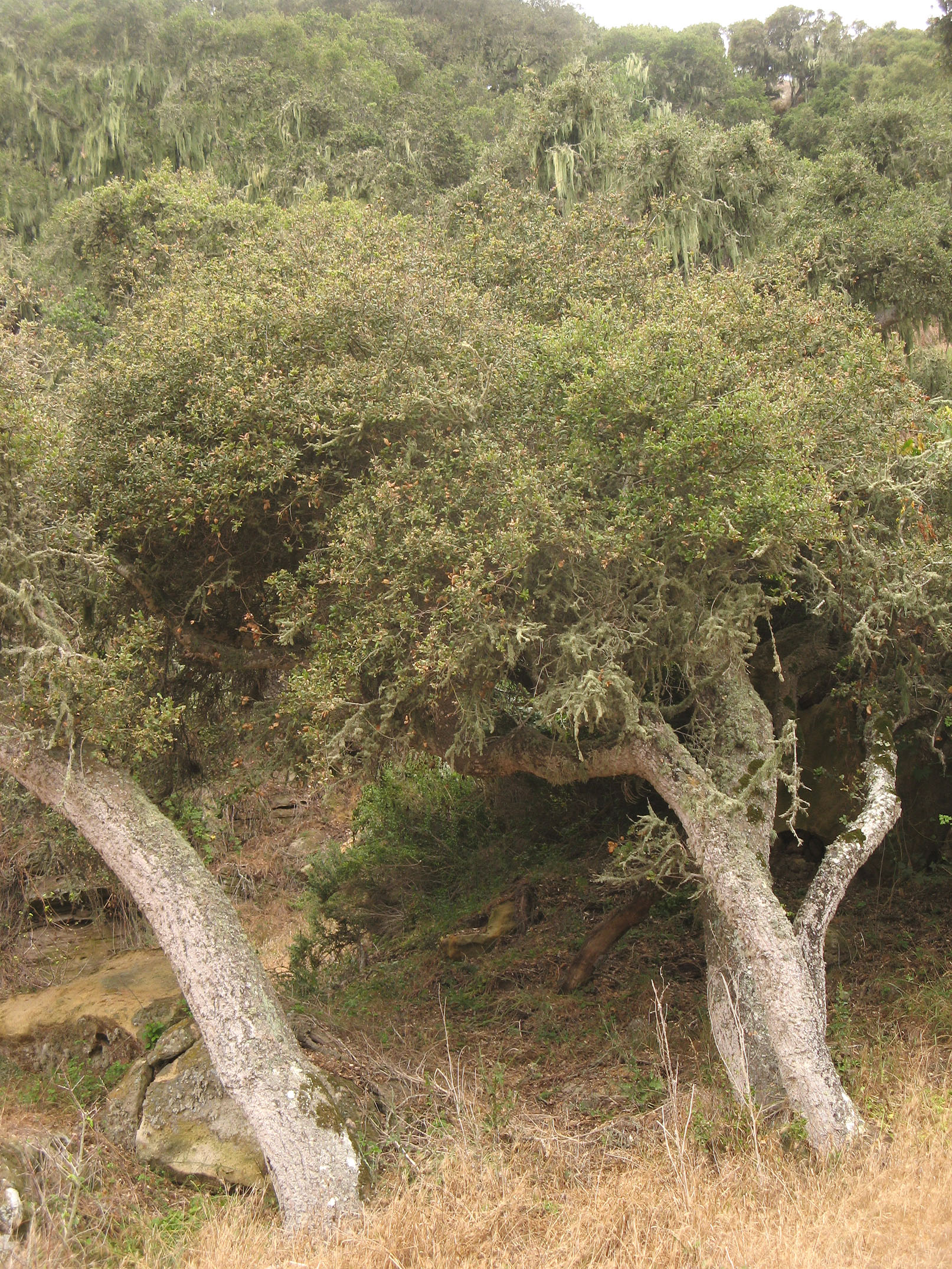
Quercus tomentella in habitat on Santa Rosa Island, California

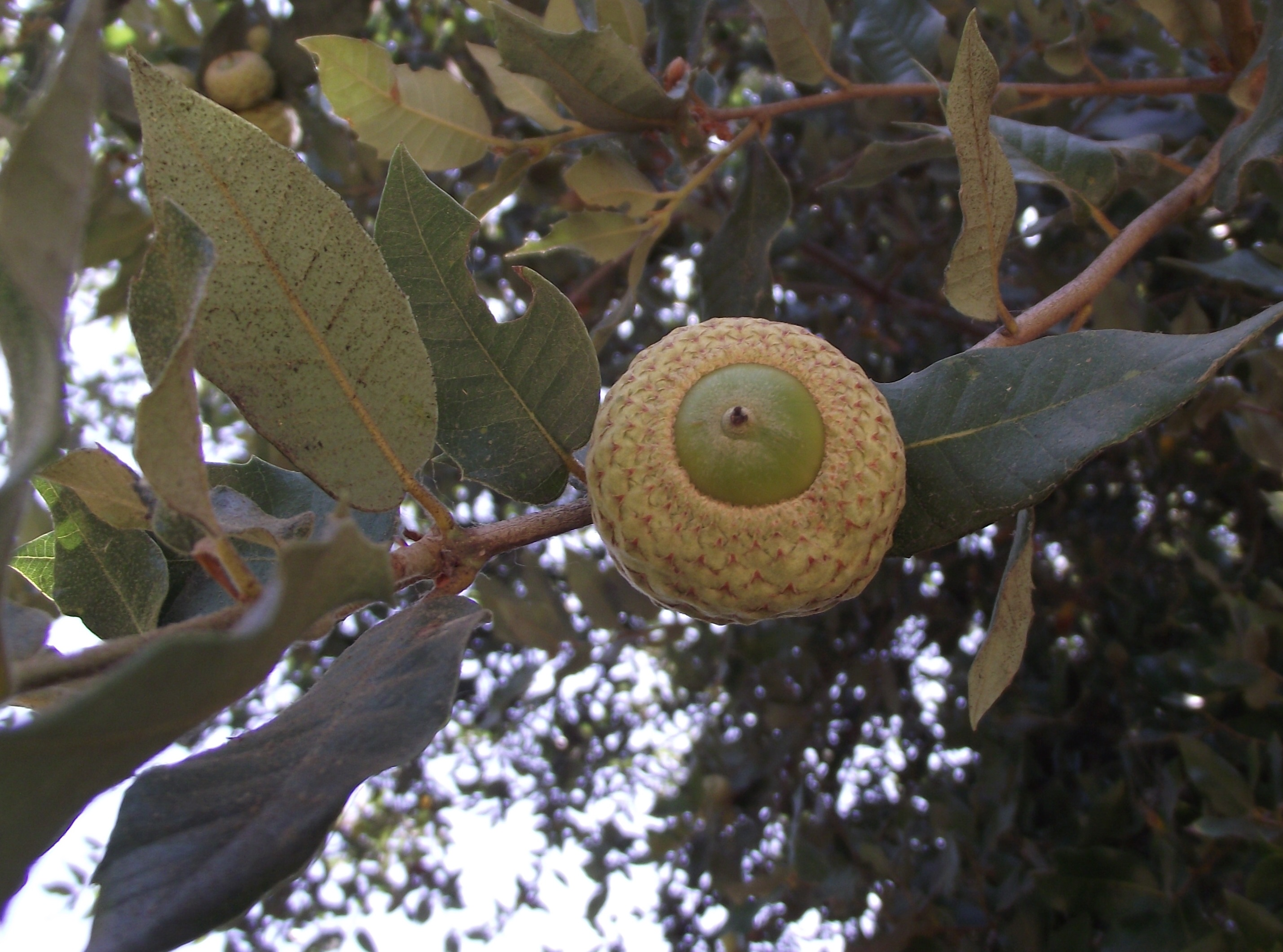
Quercus tomentella acorn

=== Section Ponticae ===
Quercus sect. Ponticae was first established by Boris Stefanoff in 1930. It has also been treated as a subsection and a series, including under the name Q. ser. Sadlerianae Trelease.

Species are shrubs or small trees, with rhizomes. The staminate catkins are up to 10 cm long. The cup (cupule) at the base of the acorn has scales with sharp angled ends. The leaves are either evergreen or deciduous, with simple or compound teeth. The leaf buds are large, enclosed in loosely attached scales.

There are only two species, Quercus pontica and Quercus sadleriana. They have disjoint distributions. Quercus pontica is native to mountainous areas of north-eastern Turkey and western Georgia. Quercus sadleriana is native to northern-most California and southern-most Oregon in the United States.

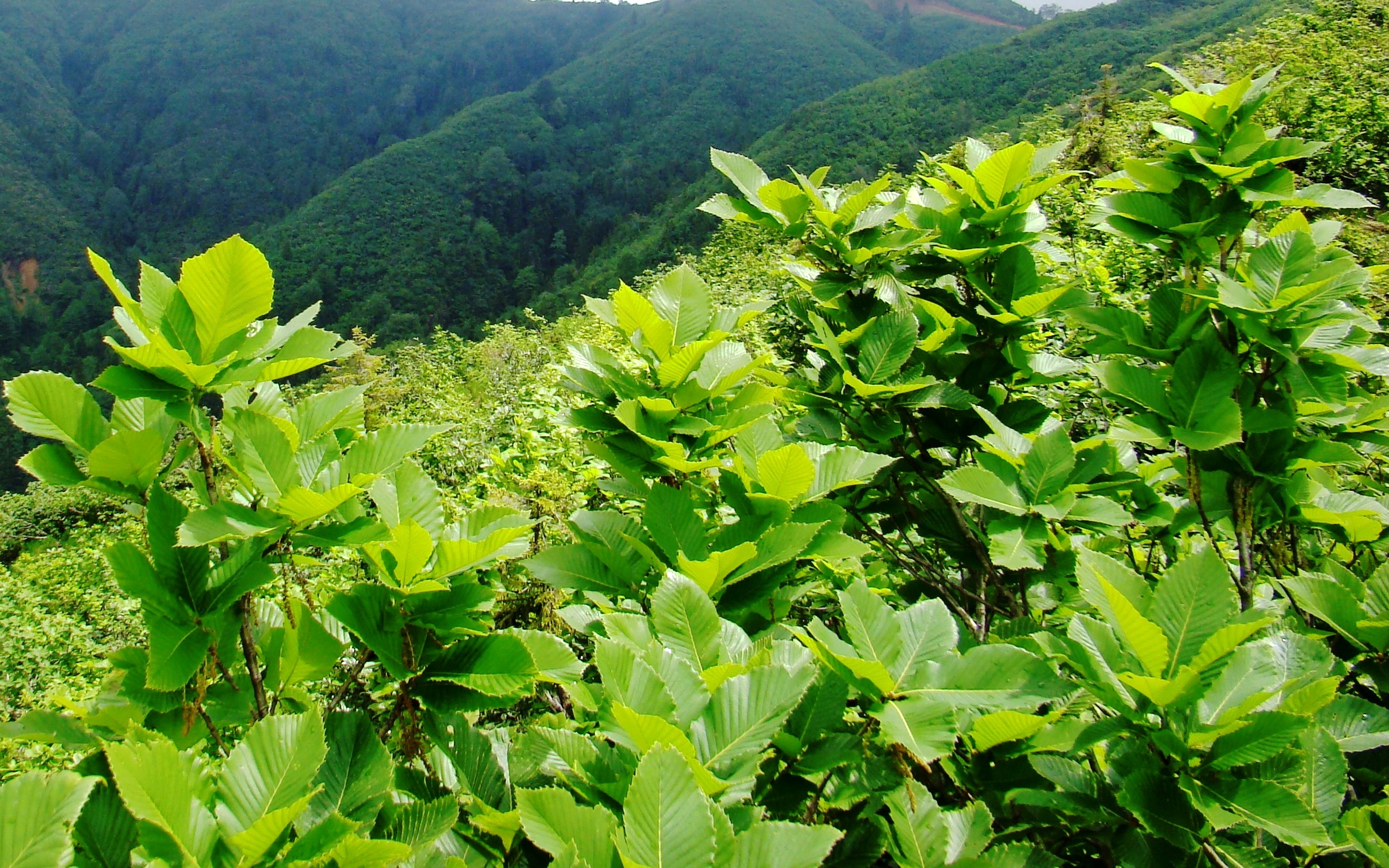
Quercus pontica in habitat

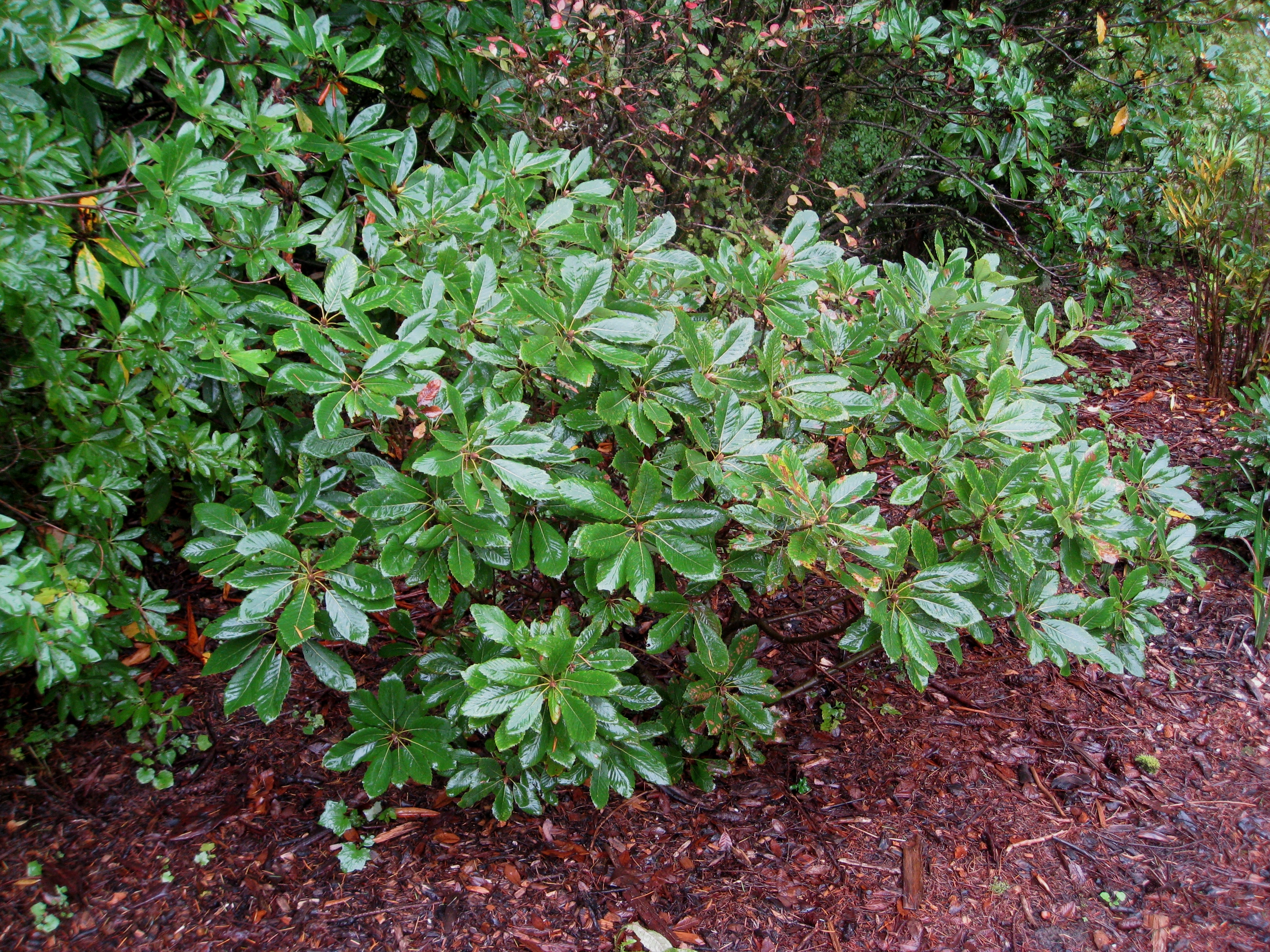
Quercus sadleriana in cultivation

=== Section Virentes ===
Quercus sect. Virentes was first established by John Claudius Loudon in 1838. It has also been treated as a series. Members of the section may be called live oaks.

Species are trees or rhizomatous shrubs. They are evergreen or brevideciduous. The acorns mature in a year. The cup at the base of the acorn has narrowly triangular scales, with thin keels, at most small bumps (tubercules), and sharp angled ends. The leaves are evergreen or almost so. A distinctive feature of the section is that the germinating seed has fused seed leaves (cotyledons) and an elongated stem above the cotyledons (the epicotyl) that forms a tube, while the stem below the cotyledons (the hypocotyl) is tuberous.

The section contains seven species, native to south-eastern Northern America, Mexico, the West Indies (Cuba), and Central America.

=== Section Quercus ===
Quercus sect. Quercus has been known, either in whole or part, by a variety of names in the past, including Quercus sect. Albae, Quercus sect. Macrocarpae and Quercus sect. Mesobalanus. Members of the section may be called white oaks. The section includes all white oaks from North America (treated by Trelease as subgenus Leucobalanus).

The staminate flowers have seven or more stamens. The acorns mature in one year. The seed leaves (cotyledons) are either free or fused together. The cup at the base of the acorn has thickened triangular scales that are either free or fused at the base and have sharp angled tips. The scales have keels and are often covered with small bumps (tuberculate). The leaf teeth typically do not have either bristle-like or spiny tips.

There are about 150 species, native to Northern America, Mexico, Central America, western Eurasia, East Asia, and North Africa.

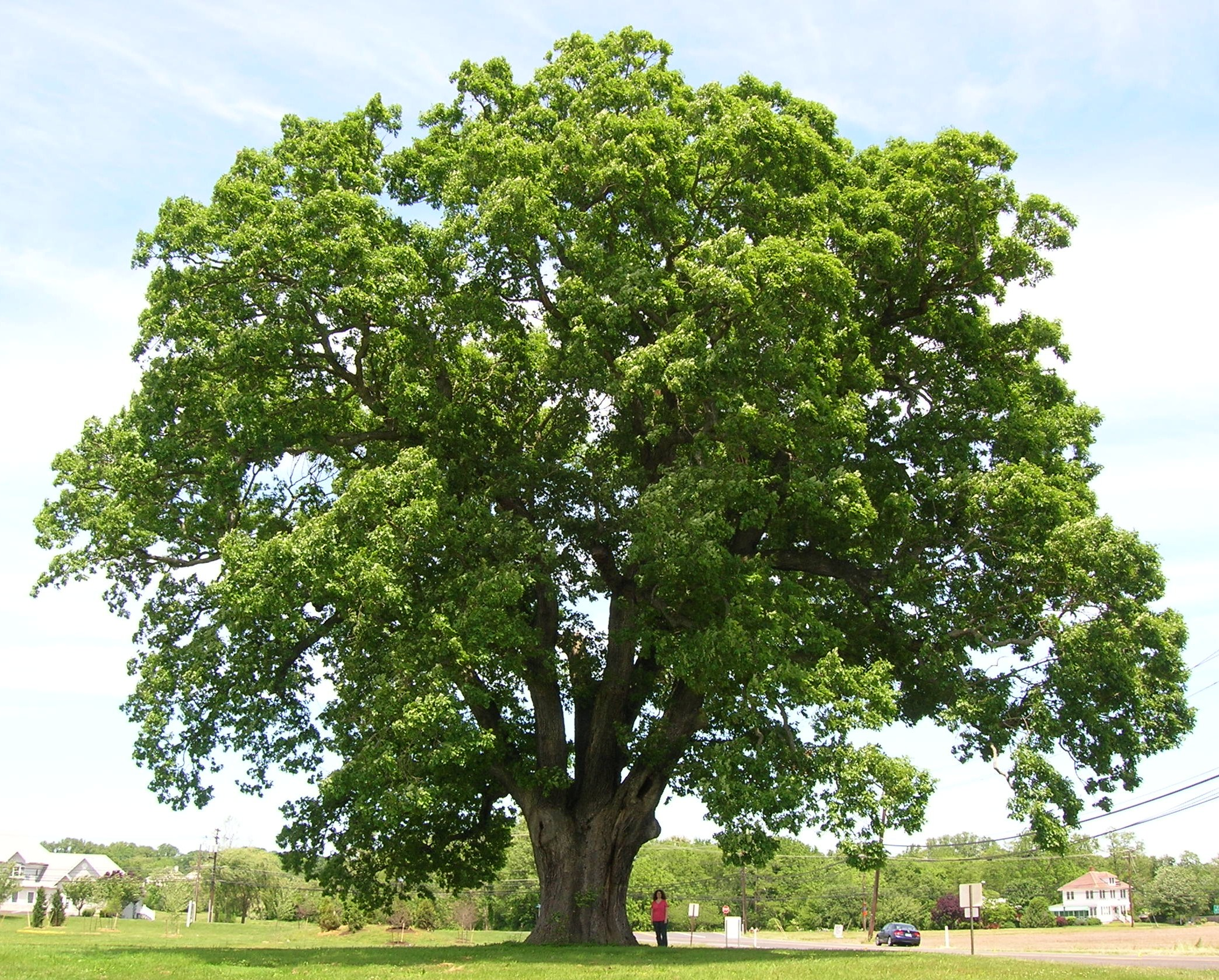
Large Quercus alba growing in New Jersey

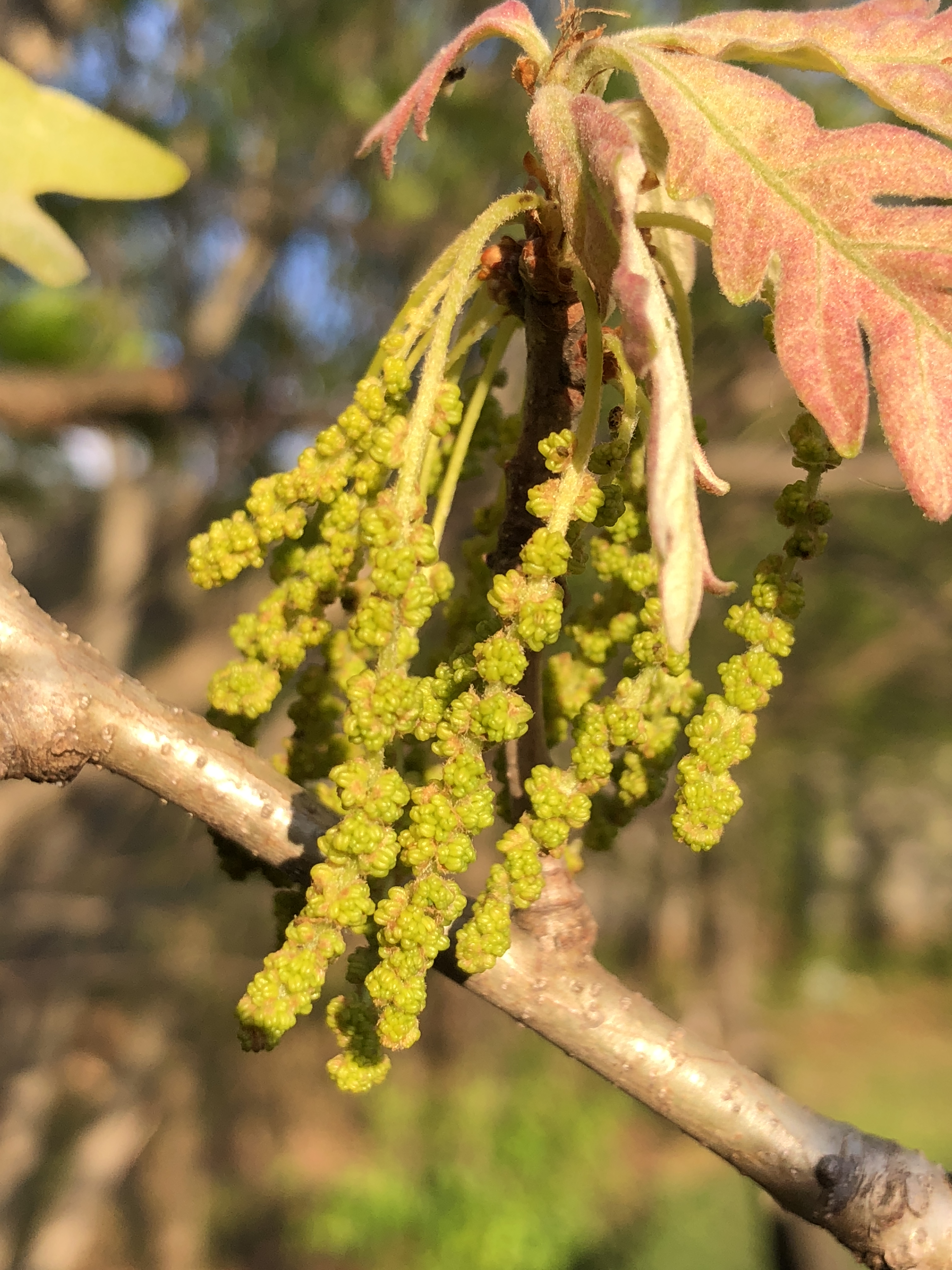
Quercus alba catkins (staminate or 'male' flowers)

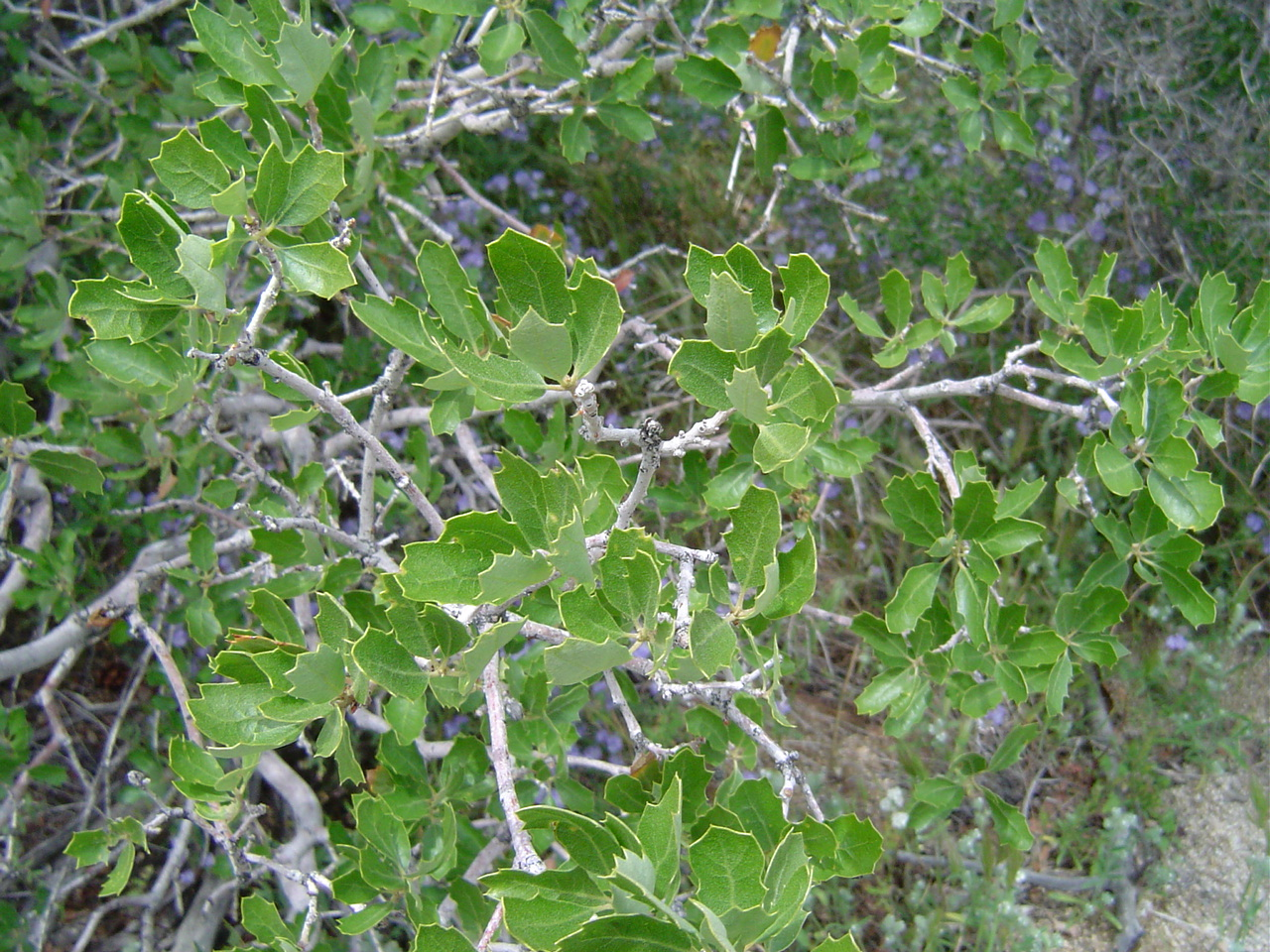
Quercus berberidifolia in habitat in California

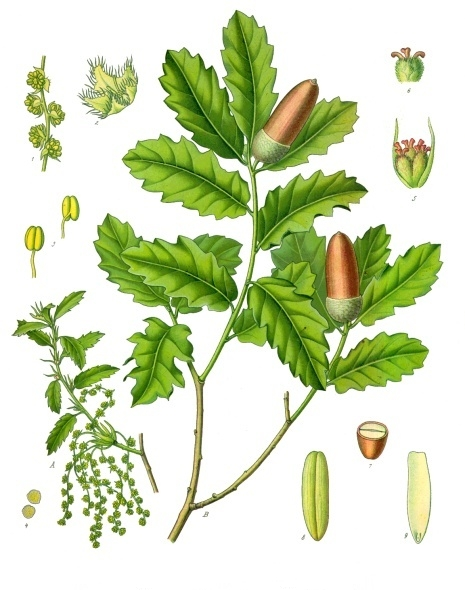
Q. lusitanica flowers, staminate (left) and pistillate (top right)

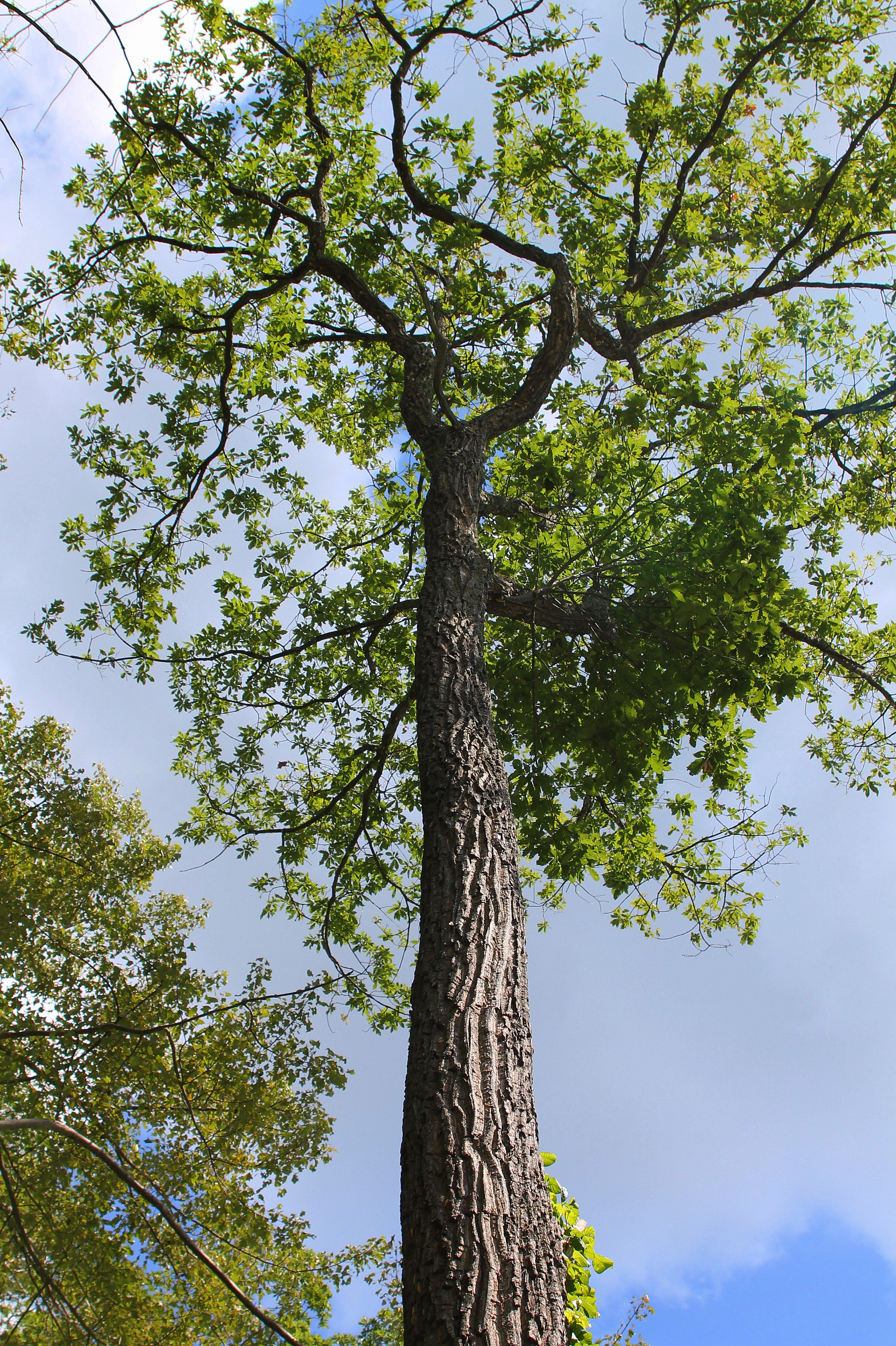
Q. montana in Pennsylvania

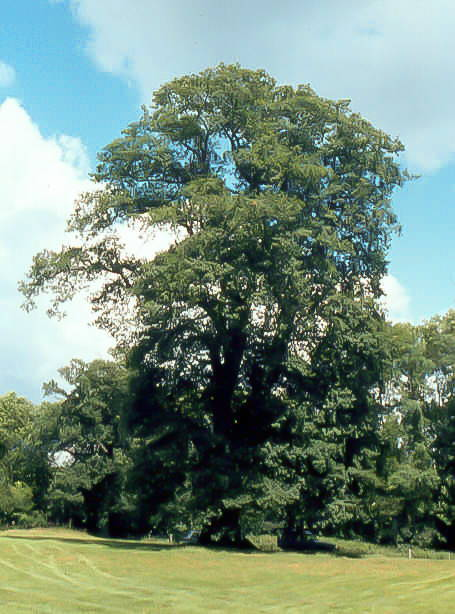
Q. petraea in England, about 300 years old

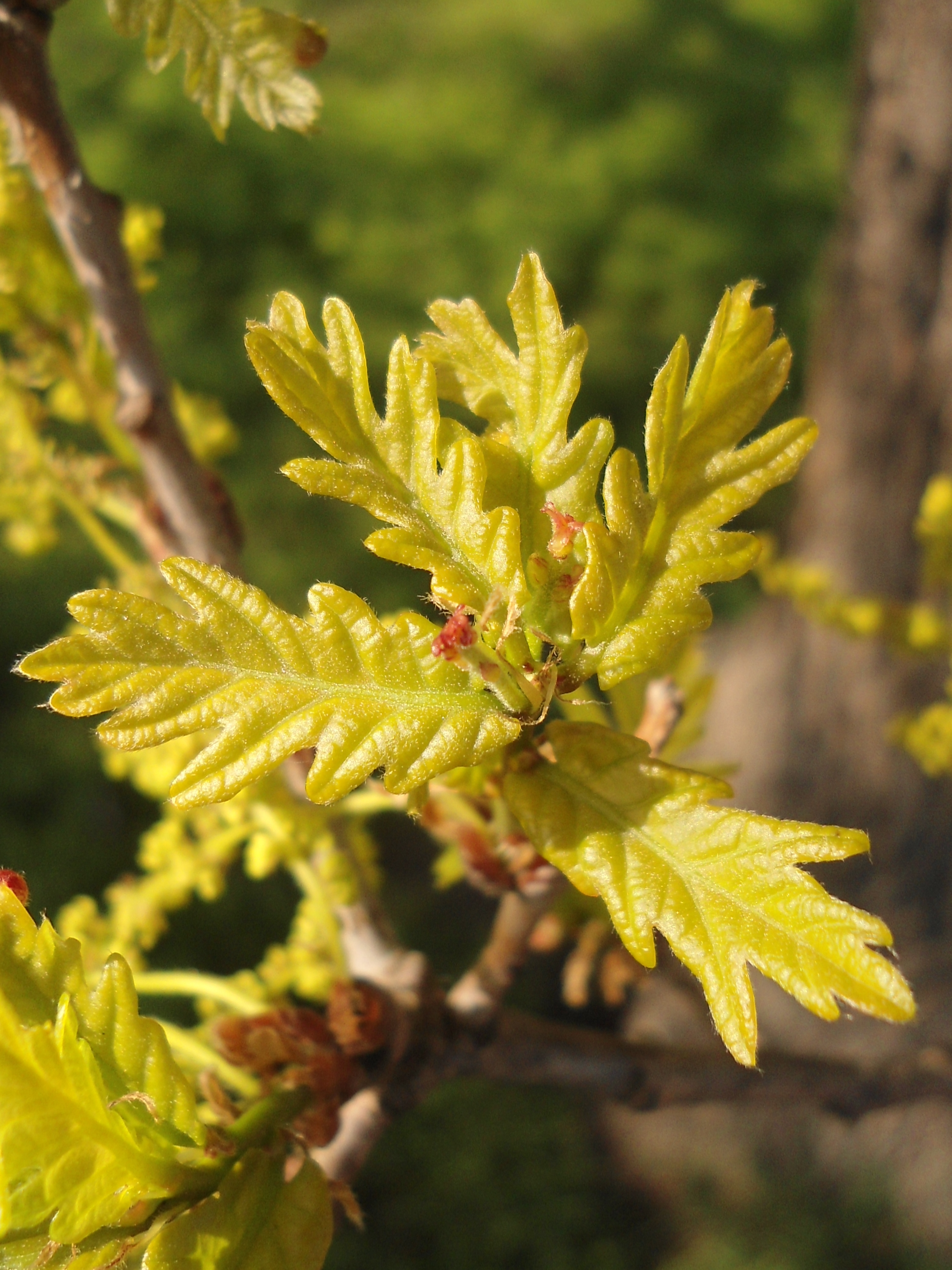
Q. robur, new leaves and pistillate flowers

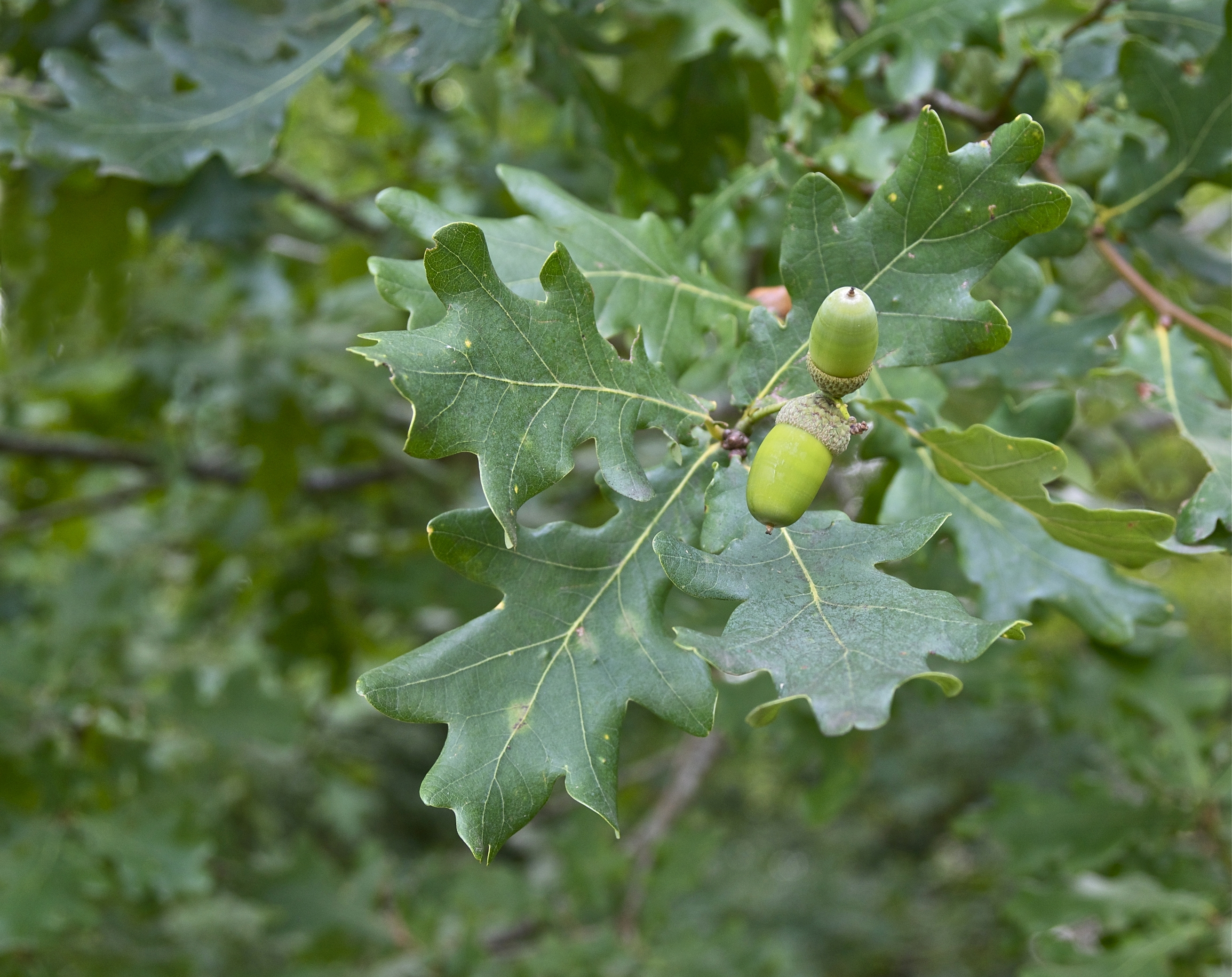
Q. robur leaves and acorns
