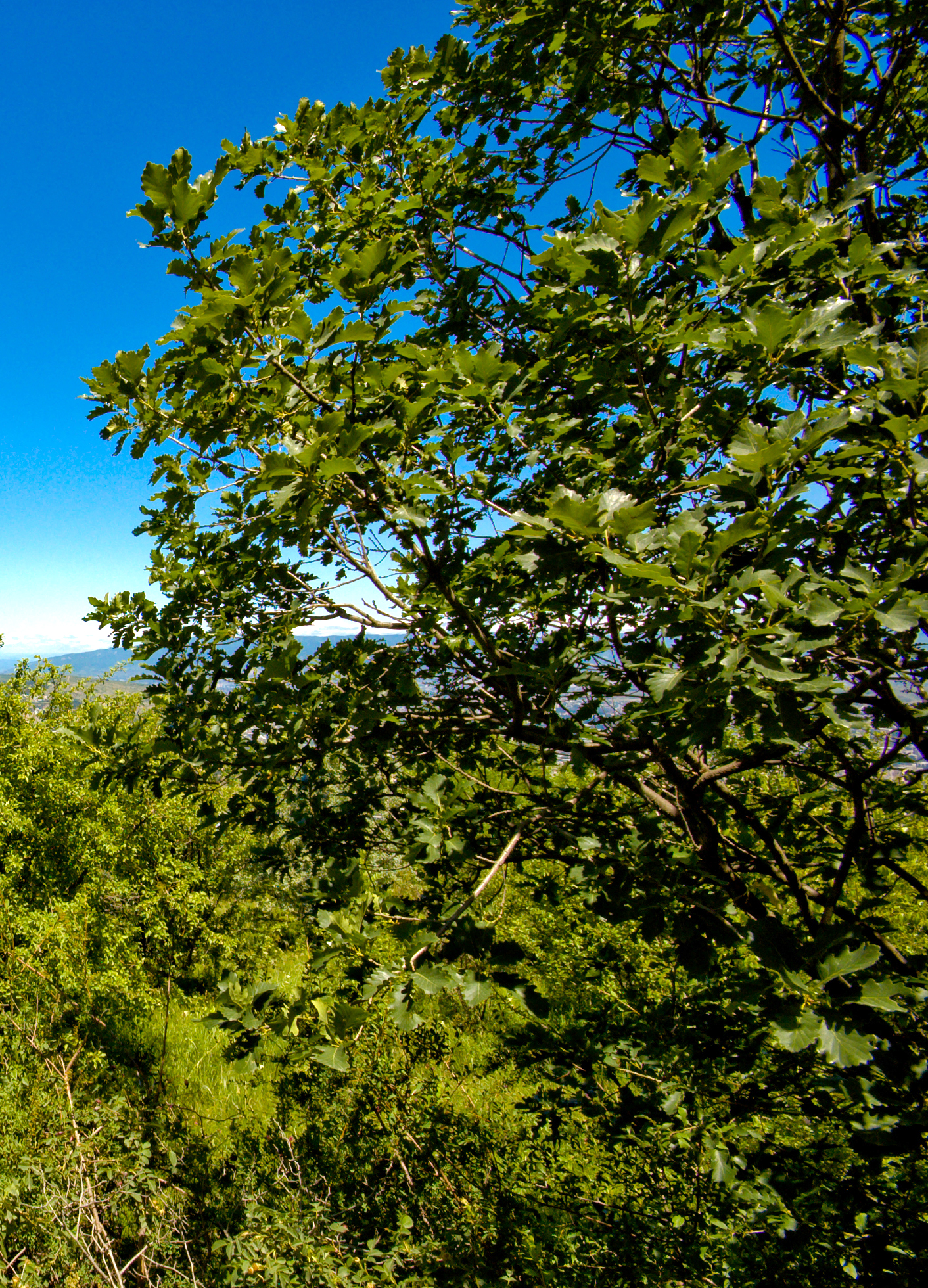

Conservation status
- Least Concern (IUCN 3.1)

Scientific classification
- Kingdom: Plantae
- Clade: Embryophytes
- Clade: Tracheophytes
- Clade: Spermatophytes
- Clade: Angiosperms
- Clade: Eudicots
- Clade: Rosids
- Order: Fagales
- Family: Fagaceae
- Genus: Quercus
- Subgenus: Quercus subg. Quercus
- Section: Quercus sect. Quercus
- Species: Q. macranthera

Binomial name
- Quercus macranthera Fisch. & C.A.Mey. ex Hohen.

Synonyms
- List: Quercus bornmuelleriana O.Schwarz; Quercus syspirensis K.Koch

= Quercus macranthera =

Caucasian oak

Species of oak tree

Quercus macranthera, commonly called as the Caucasian oak, or the Persian oak, is a species of deciduous tree native to Western Asia (northern Iran, Turkey; and in the Caucasus in Georgia, Armenia, and Azerbaijan) that is occasionally grown as an ornamental tree in Europe growing to 30 metres (98 feet) tall. It is placed in section Quercus.

== Subspecies ==
It has two subspecies. One subspecies (Quercus macranthera subsp. syspirensis) is found in the common thermophilic lower- and mid-montane shrub communities of Turkey, and the other subspecies (Quercus macranthera subsp. macranthera) is found in Georgia, Armenia, Azerbaijan and northern Iran, along the Caspian Sea.
