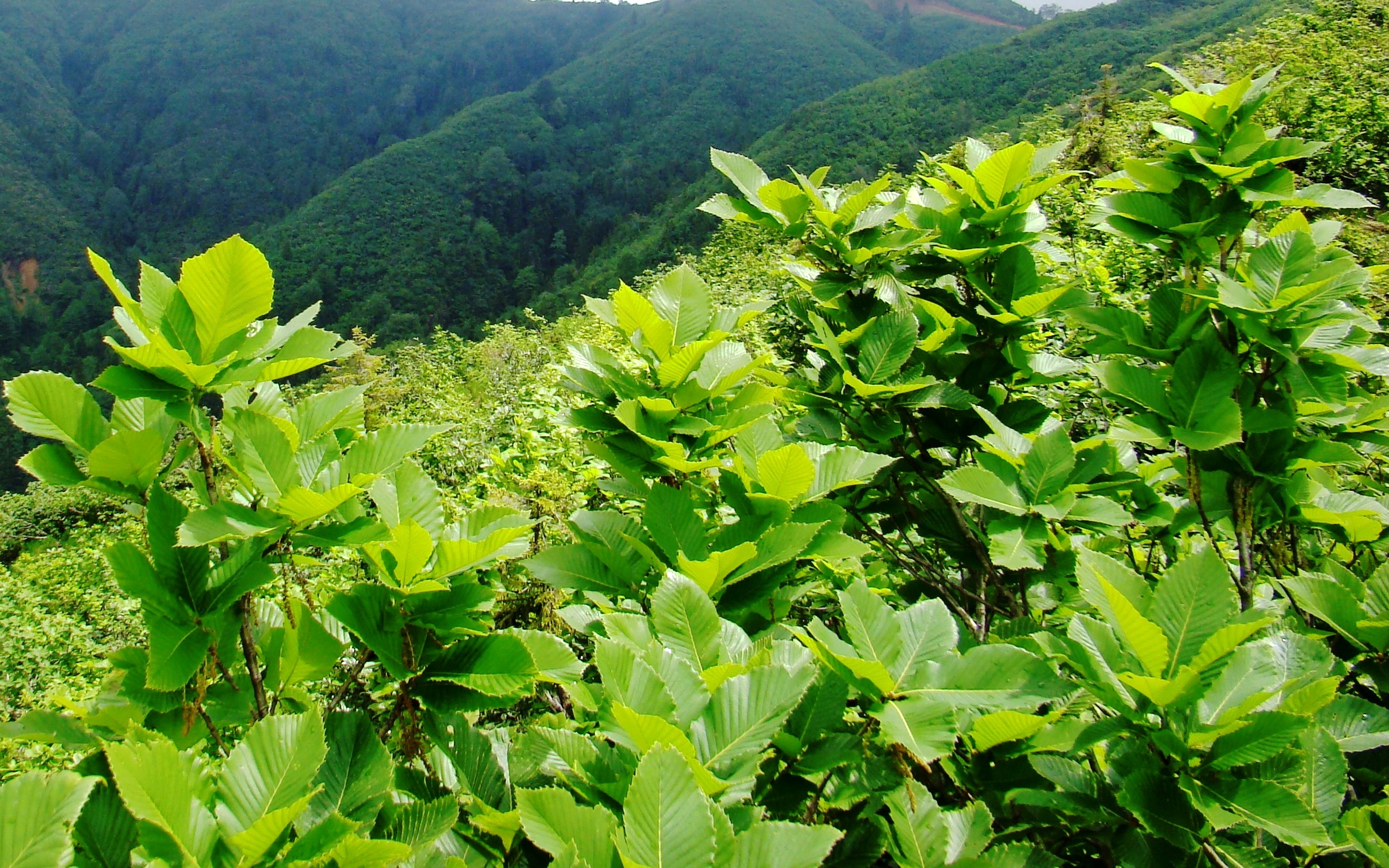

Conservation status
- Endangered (IUCN 3.1)

Scientific classification
- Kingdom: Plantae
- Clade: Embryophytes
- Clade: Tracheophytes
- Clade: Spermatophytes
- Clade: Angiosperms
- Clade: Eudicots
- Clade: Rosids
- Order: Fagales
- Family: Fagaceae
- Genus: Quercus
- Subgenus: Quercus subg. Quercus
- Section: Quercus sect. Ponticae
- Species: Q. pontica

Binomial name
- Quercus pontica K.Koch

= Quercus pontica =

Species of oak tree

Quercus pontica, the Pontic oak or Armenian oak, is a species of endangered oak in the family Fagaceae. It is currently extant to the western Caucasus mountains of Georgia and northeastern Turkey where it grows at elevations of 1,300–2,100 metres (4,300–6,900 feet).

== Description ==
Quercus pontica is a deciduous small tree or large shrub growing to 6–10 metres (20–33 feet) tall, with a trunk up to 40 centimetres (16 inches) in diameter and sparse, stout shoots. Its bark is greyish to purple-brown, smooth on young trees but becoming rough later in its life. Its leaves grow to 10–20 cm (4–8 in) long, rarely 35 cm, and 4–15 cm across. They are ovate, and have a serrated margin with numerous small, pointed teeth. The leaves are covered in hairs when they are young, but become smoother as they age. They become bright green later in life and turn yellow brown in autumn. The flowers are catkins, the male catkins 5–20 cm long. The fruit is a large acorn 2.5–4 cm long, produced in clusters of 2–5 together.

== Taxonomy ==
The specific epithet pontica, refers to the Latin term for Pontus, a historical region near the Black Sea where the tree is found. It is not to be confused with the Pontine Marshes outside Rome. Quercus pontica is placed in section Ponticae.

== Cultivation ==
It is occasionally grown as an ornamental tree in northern Europe.

== Other sources ==
- Rushforth, K. D. Trees of Britain and Europe. Collins.
- Coombes, A. J. Trees. Eyewitness Handbooks.
