= Lezgin clans =

Lezgin clans or sykhyls (also tukhums) (Lezgian: си́хил, [sykhyl]) are traditional Lezgin kinship groups sharing self-identified through descent from a common ancestor.

== Etymology ==
The Lezgin name for clans is shykhyl «сихил» comes from two Lezgin words tsi «цӀи» and khel «хел» literally “bloodline”. Lezgins also use the term tukhum «тухум», it is a term is more general and used by all Dagestani peoples for a tribe or family. The term is used to describe different clan structures for different ethnicities and does not mean the same thing from one ethnicity to the other.

== History ==
After Russian conquest of the Caucasus the Lezgin sykhyls or tukhums has all but vanished. While the aul was, like the Avar and Dargin auls, the basis of Lezgin society in pre-revolutionary times, the aul and the Jamaat have lost their role. The reasons for this range from their homeland being more open to external influence, culturally from neighbouring Azeris and politically from the USSR, as well as the loss of the Lezgin Tariqa (Мюридизм) to the USSR's state atheism and the more recent penetration of Salafism into Lezgin society.

=== Clan organization ===
Each sykhyl spoke a different dialect of the same Lezgic languages, a common spoken Lezgin dialect unintelligible to people outside the village. Despite the fact that during this period the Lezgin lived in relatively closed conditions of mountain gorges, which contributed to more demarcation in terms of territoriality than rallying around a single center, they retained the self-consciousness of a single ethnic group based on a common culture and a single language.

== List of clans ==
Clans	Groups	Villages
Lazar	КIекрезчирайбур, Шатдин, КIелет-лацар, Кетшар, Тачанар, Рухкалчукайбур	Laza (Qusar) Laza (Qəbələ)
Lakar	Айибар, Сеферар, Пиримар, Тигьирар, СикIер, Шухунар, Шагьабасар	Ləgər, Ləgəroba, Ləngi, Lgar (Axtı)
Quruşar (Gelar)	Хайтакьар, Гьилевар, Тетецьар, Фалакьар, Къызырар, Хъиртар, Мисрияр, Зангавар, Авурар, Къуьлдуьрар, Гьебешар, ЧIулавар.	Quruş, Doqquzpara, Dağıstan Quruş, Xasavyurt, Dağıstan Qəmərvan, Qəbələ, Azərbaycan Qayakənd, Qusar, Azərbaycan
Baxsuğar	1.Али кІар 2.Баш кІар 3. Хушум кІар 4. Тумакь кІар 5. Ворха (Фарух) кІар 6. Тадам (Дедем) кІар 7.ЦІарал сихил	Baxsuğ, Qurah, Dağıstan Avaran, Qusar, Azərbaycan Avaranoba, Qusar, Azərbaycan Minaxür, Qusar, Azərbaycan Budahan, Türkiyə
Çeper	Абдуллагьар, Лак1ар, Ювар, КIамаъар, Ягъияр, Гьесенар>	Çipir, Qusar, Azərbaycan Çeper, Axtı, Dağıstan
Ünüğar	Айдаяр, Арабар, Чакъалар, Фекьияр, Гьажиханар, Пиемар, Татлаяр, ТIигьирар, Мискискар, Къарабагьвияр, Эгрияр, Кесдияр, Абукарар	Ünüğ, Ünüğoba
Kuzunar	Немцар, Талакьар, Гьизирар, Къадияр	Kuzun, Kuzunoba, Çetkün
Muruğar	Мегьенар, Якьубар, Татахар, Хасияр, Кемечар, Къурушар, СикIер, Думбар, ПешекIар, Баргуьлар, Шемехар, Игъригъар, Айдунбегар	Böyük Muruğ, Muruğ, Muruğoba, Atlıxan
Çakarar	Незерар, Везирар, Маллаяр, Къежелар, Сарахар, Кьасумар, Агьасар, Алхасар, Къурушар, ЦIарахар, Гъегьеяр	Çaqar, Çaqaroba,
Zalagurar	Игьирар, Зипер, Къизилбашар, Тулугьар, Чарахар, Къакъуяр, Шихмегьамедар, Сердерар, Къекъелар	Çiləgir, Qusar Çiləgir, Xaçmaz
Vurvar	Къурушар, Накьвнедайбур, Шихмегьамедар, ШтIар, Хъуьрехъар, Неъар, Къакъуяр	Urva, Urvaoba
Evecuğar	Гъетегьар, Микраuьар, ШтIар, Къурушар, Дугулар, Тамашар, Къекъемар, Азизан тухум, Пархашар	Evecuğ
Hilar	Къуьсуьяр, Эребханар, БакIияр, Бегар, Ваданар, Шебеяр, Мирзагьаяр, Наруяр, КIаркIарар, Какамар, Къарагадаяр, МучIар, Къарчугьаяр, ШтIар, Фекьияр, Айвазар, КалацIар	Hil, Hiloba,
Yasabar	Игьирар, Югьвар, Кереяр, Фарухар, Xъазахар, Кабчаяр, ЦIияпIар, Секуьлар, Филифар, Гъетегьар, Рагьманар, Дандасар, Кулар	Yasab,Yasaboba,
Piriviyar (Likar)	Пашмакар, Хъумар, Къунагьар, Къараханар, Микрагьар, Бубаханар	Piral, Qusar, Azərbaycan
Leçetar	ЦIаруяр, Гилакар, Суьквелар	Leçet, Qusar, Azərbaycan Leçet, Xaçmaz, Azərbaycan
Kirigar	Тистарар, Чакъулуяр, Камумар, Салманар, Балаяр, СтIарар, Шаурар	Girik, Qusar, Azərbaycan
Yargunar	Тегьвер, Яцкаяр, ЦIинкьилар, Камуяр, Шаияр, Келбияр, Мегьамедалияр, Фекьияр	Yargun, Qusar, Azərbaycan Yargunoba, Qusar, Azərbaycan Həzrə, Qəbələ, Azərbaycan
Nijar	Абасар, Алияр, ЦIегьрен кIуртар, Пуларар, Кижер	Nij (Nəcəfkənd), Qusar, Azərbaycan Nijeroba (Nəcəfkəndoba), Qusar, Azərbaycan
Xülüxar	Латар, КачIкачIар, СафутIар, Кисранар, Текияр	Xülüx, Qusar, Azərbaycan Xülüxoba, Qusar, Azərbaycan
Muçuğar	Гьуку, Гъугьан, Ваданар, ЯпатIар, Шавдияр, Мегьецар, Хачмазар, Къазбинар, Херекар, Каситар, Чепелар, КIирияр, Къурушар, Къажарар, ЧIакIарар , Ширлияр.	Mucuq, Qusar, Azərbaycan Mucuqoba, Qusar, Azərbaycan
Keletar	Мегьтияр, Мензифар, Улуяр, Машахар, БалбутIар, Самалчияр,Тачанар	Qalacıq, Qalacıq, Qalacux (Dağıstan)
Zeyxurar	Тумушар, ЦIурухтаяр, Шагьнияр, Кирер, Еркер, Ахцегьар, Мутаяр, Пислингар	Yuxarı Zeyxur, Zeyxur, Zeyxuroba
Kurar	Текияр, ЗатIар, Гьуьнияр, Xъазахар, Чухурар, Яхшаяр, Агьабубаяр, Шандаяр, Шихияр, Куьснетар	Ukur, Ukuroba
Eçetar	Латун, Чепен, Кучун, Муьнкуьтар, АмутIар, Туькуьлар, Шуьгънуьяр, Гьажияр, Алиханар, Фекьияр, Муьхкуьткуьс, Батманар, Датар, Имамар, Агьмедар	Əcəxur, Əcəxuroba
Ptişar	Кенцемар, Шамшамар, Цемеяр, Хунчаяр, Перциввекъядайбур, Мирзеханар, Кичидин эвлед, Кимицар	Pitişqala
Maqudar	Микрагьар, КьинтIарар, ТIапIацар, Квасаяр, Киригар, Цегвер, Хуьлуьхъар, ТIигьиржалар, Чепер, Цилингар, Гуржияр, Чавмараяр.	Maqudxür, Maqudoba
Mugrağar	Муграгъар	Mugrağ (Qusar), Migrağ(Doqquzpara), Sumağallı
Qüxürar	ЧипетӀар, МихетӀар, Кузар, Манатар, Тукъвацар	Quxur, Quxuroba
Ptirar	Лагьичар, Татар, ШутӀар, ТипӀер, Тугьулар	Bedirqala, Haçatala
Kalunar	Рехецар, Ханар, Таравар, Шидияр	Yuxarı Qələnxur, Aşağı Qələnxur
Tihirar	ЧӀухар, Туькьуьлар, Чувалар, КьепӀирар, Фекьияр	Tihir, Tihiroba,
Tihirjalar	Тигьиржалар	Yuxarı Tahircal, Yeni Tahircal
Sevreganar	Севреганар	Dizaxli, Yeni Dizaxli
Ğener	Шихар, Ашурар, Мустафаяр, Исмаилар	Kənarçay
Ğunar	Гъунар, Калунар	Gündüzqala
Kçanar	Кчанар, Къурушар, Алияр	Gican, Gicanoba
Kufar	Куьчайбур, Умарар, Усманар	Kuf, Kufoba
Qileğar	Къилегъар	Gilah, Gilahoba
Qaratar	Къаратар, Керимар, Мегьамедалияр	Qarat, Qaratoba
Quturğanar	ТӀампӀулар, ЧӀамбулар, Гьетемар	Quturğan
Suvajalar	КӀелехудатар, Куркунар, Муругъар, Шабранар	Suvacal
Sturar	Батар, Аскерар, ЧӀамбулар, Дахарар, Мемехар	Sudur, Suduroba
Ezdenar	Макьияр, Сфияр.Султаяр, Ч|уьтер, Мугъуяр.	Ezden, Üzdenoba
Xatar	Игъирар, Чахчар, Багъияр, Агъарзаяр, КъепӀирар, Микрагьар, Текияр, Угъулар, Ахцегьар, ТӀигьиржалар, КӀелетар	Xatar(Köhnə Xudat), Xatar oba (Köhnə Xudat qazmalar), Xatar tala(Köhnə Xudat, Xaçmaz)
Siriyar	Сирияр, Пустуяр, Ханацар, Шабранар, Чубанар, Текеяр, Куцар, ШабукӀаяр	Şirvanovka
