= Gusar, Azerbaijan =

Gusar, Azerbaijan may refer to:

- Gusar District, a region in the northeast of Azerbaijan
- Gusar (city), the capital of the district in Azerbaijan
