= Gündüzqala =

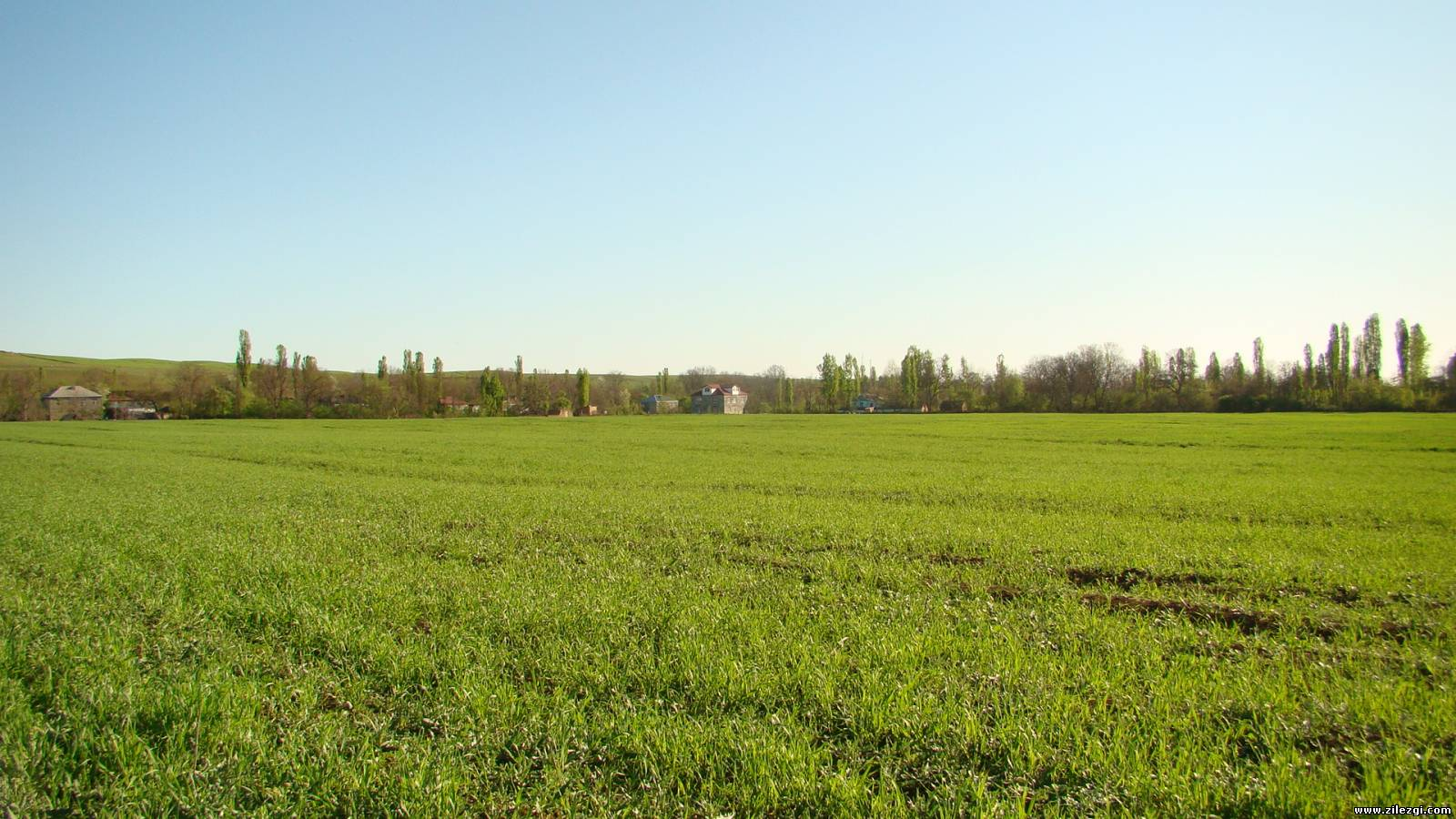
Gündüzqala
- Municipality
- Location within Azerbaijan
- Coordinates: 41°31′42″N 48°25′37″E
- Country: Azerbaijan
- Rayon: Qusar

Population
  - Total: 976
- Time zone: UTC+4 (AZT)
  - Summer (DST): UTC+5 (AZT)

Gündüzqala (also Gyunduzkala or Gyundyuzkala) is a village and municipality in the Qusar Rayon of Azerbaijan. It has a population of 976. It is located between the villages of İmamqulukənd and Bədişqala on Qusar-Imamgulukery Way.

== See also ==
- Gunduzgala Mosque
