= Baş Daşağıl =

Baş Daşağıl Lezgian: Зандакъ
- Municipality
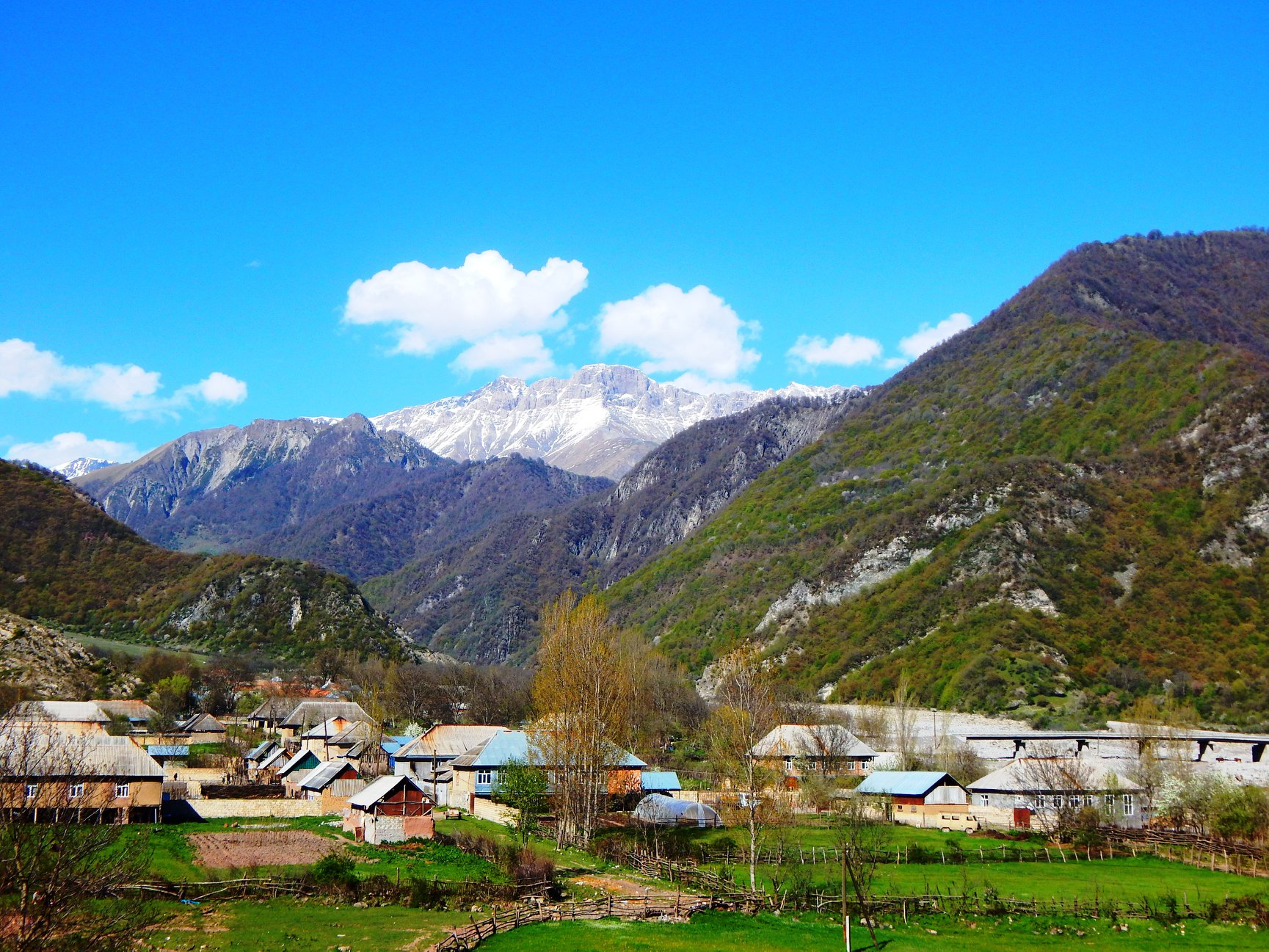

- Location within Azerbaijan Location within Shaki-Zagatala Economic Region
- Coordinates: 41°10′11″N 47°25′08″E
- Country: Azerbaijan
- Rayon: Oghuz

Population
  - Total: 1,157
- Time zone: UTC+4 (AZT)
  - Summer (DST): UTC+5 (AZT)

Baş Daşağıl (also, Bash-Dashagil’ and Bash-Dashagyl) or Zandak (also Zandaq, Lezgian: Зандакъ) is a Lezgin village and municipality in the Oghuz Rayon of Azerbaijan. It has a population of 1,157. The village is located near Mount Zandak and is the ancestral home of the Lezgin clan (sykhyl, tukhum) Zandakar.

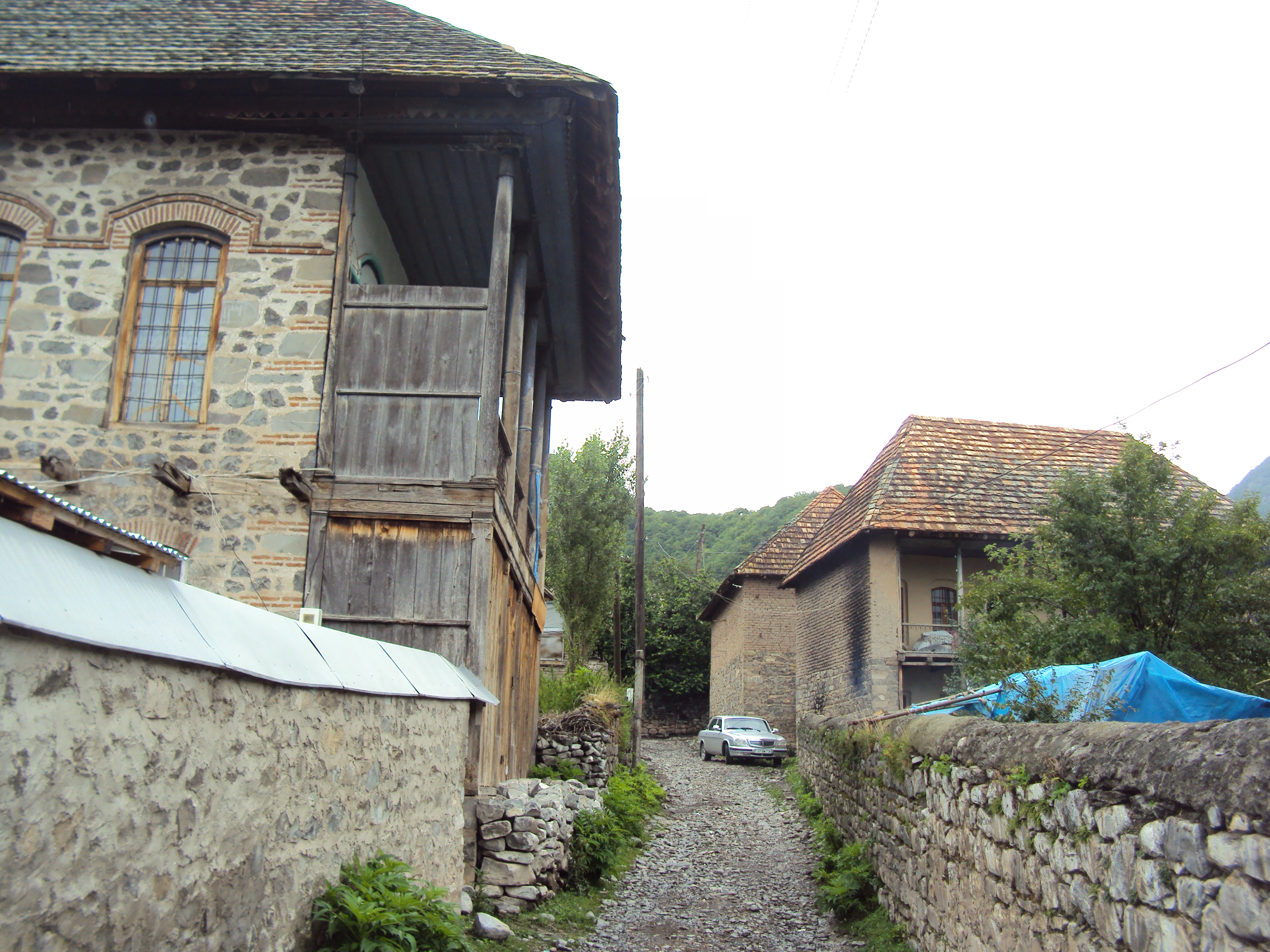
Baş Daşağıl

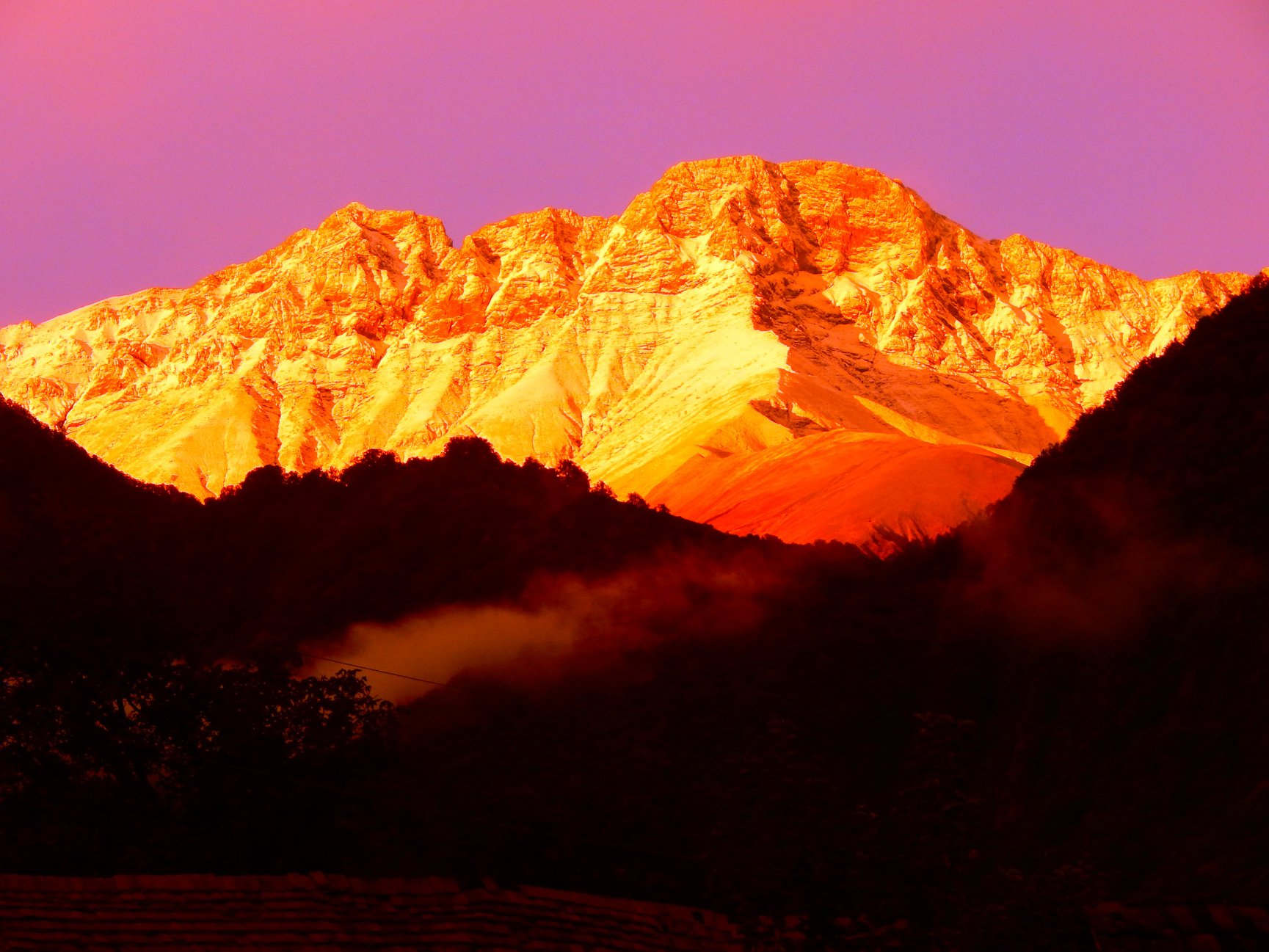
Oguz Region, Baş Daşağıl village
