= Laza, Qusar =

Laza
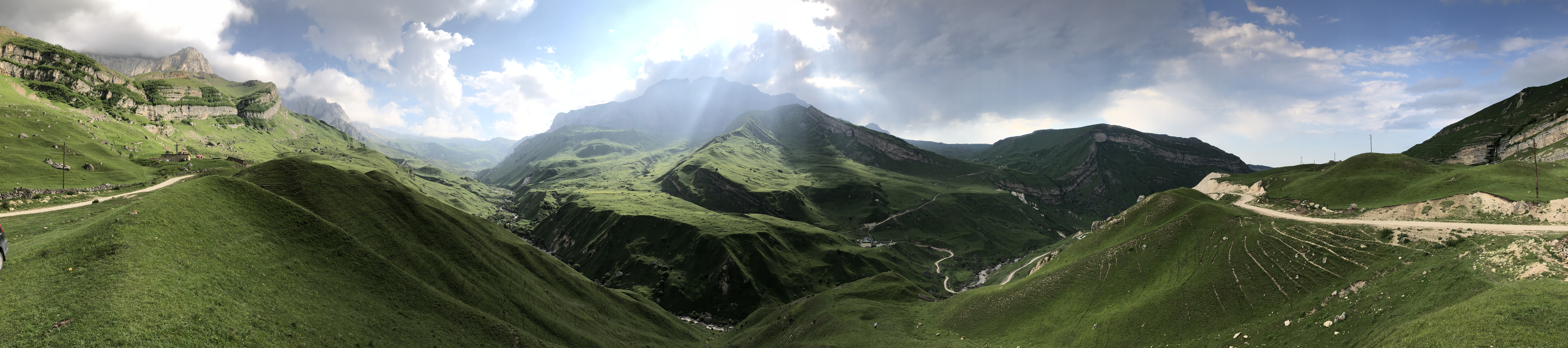

- Location within Azerbaijan
- Coordinates: 41°17′42″N 48°06′22″E
- Country: Azerbaijan
- Rayon: Qusar
- Municipality: Kuzun
- Time zone: UTC+4 (AZT)
  - Summer (DST): UTC+5 (AZT)

Laza is a village in the Qusar Rayon of Azerbaijan. The village forms part of the municipality of Kuzun.

== About ==
Laza village is located 1300 m above sea level at the foot of the Mount Shahdagh in the north-east of the Greater Caucasus. The village is well known with its numerous waterfalls.

There is a historical monument – a 300-year-old mosque in the village.

Ethnic Lezgins live in the village. There are 28 houses in the village of Laza where nearly 170 people live. The main occupation of the residents is cattle-breeding. People cultivate potatoes and cabbage.

== Gallery ==
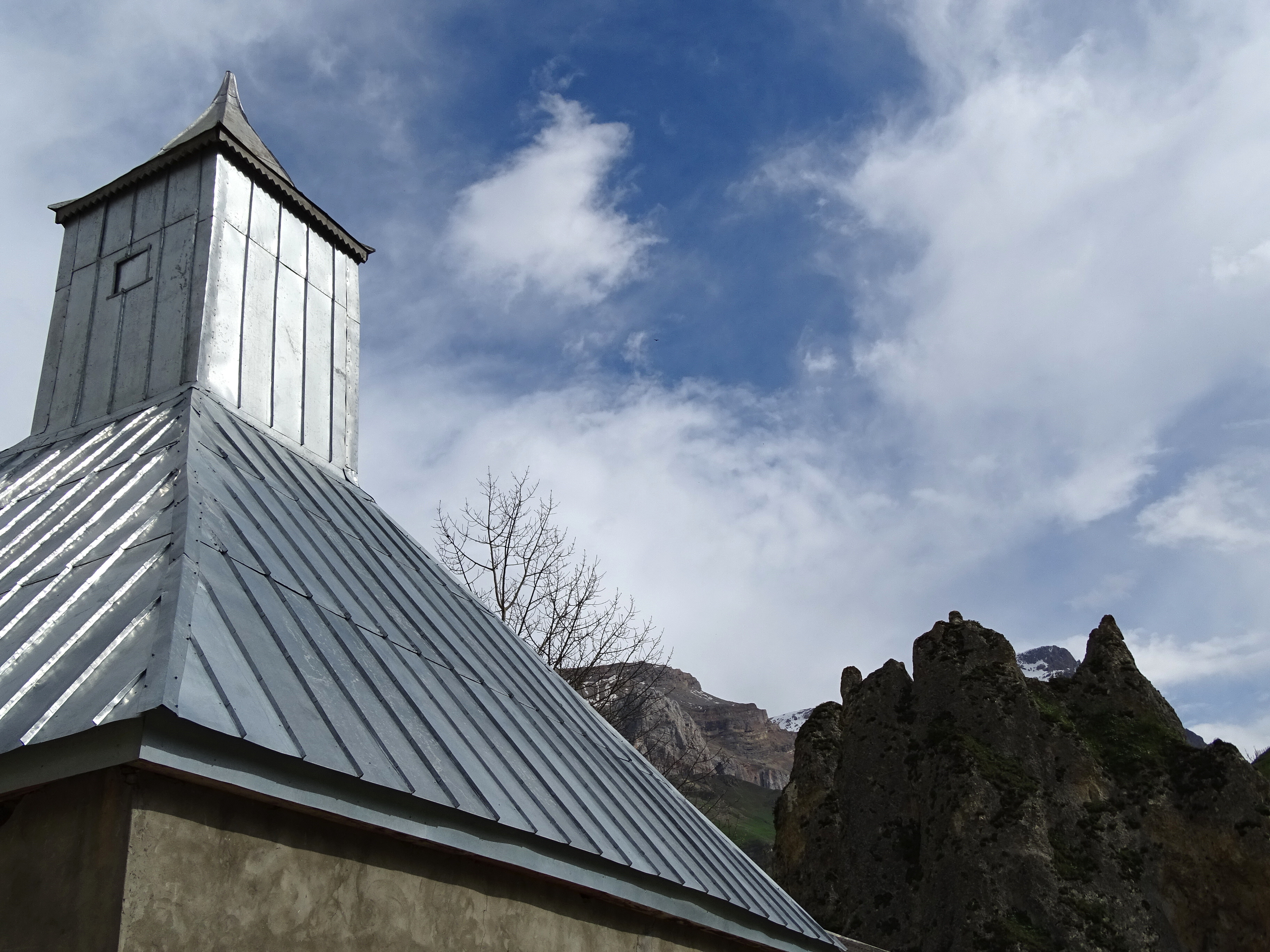
Laza mosque

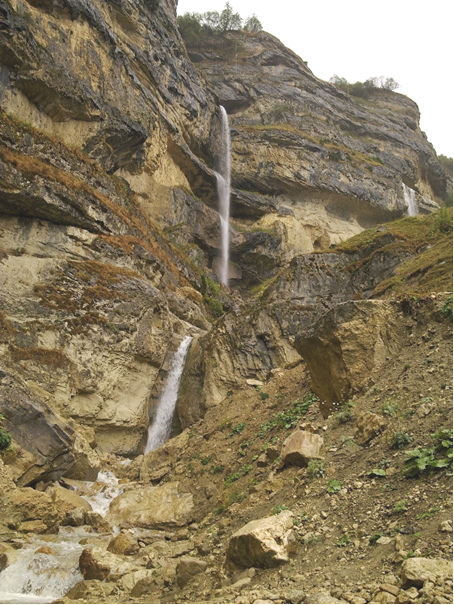
Laza fall

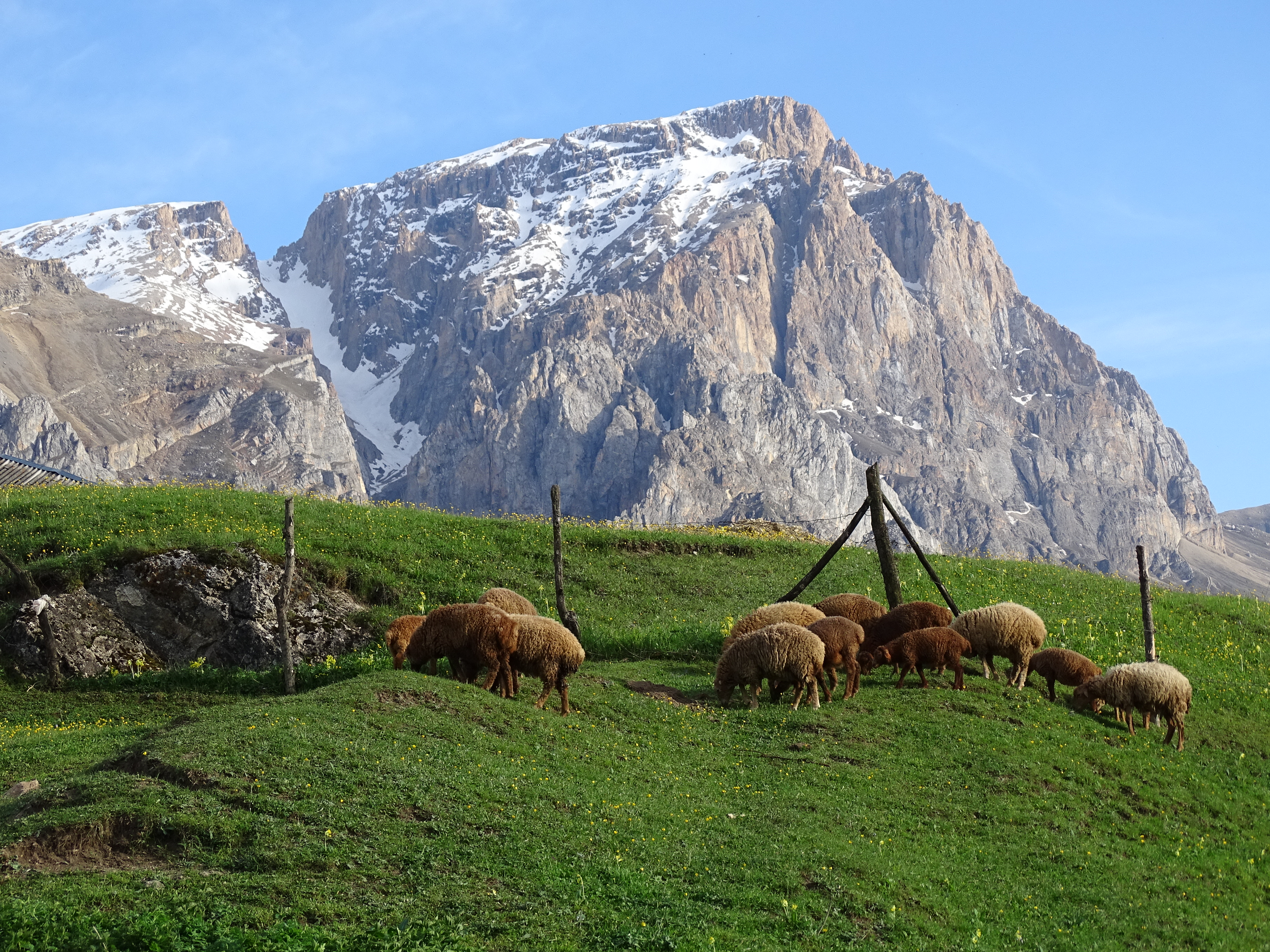
Laza village

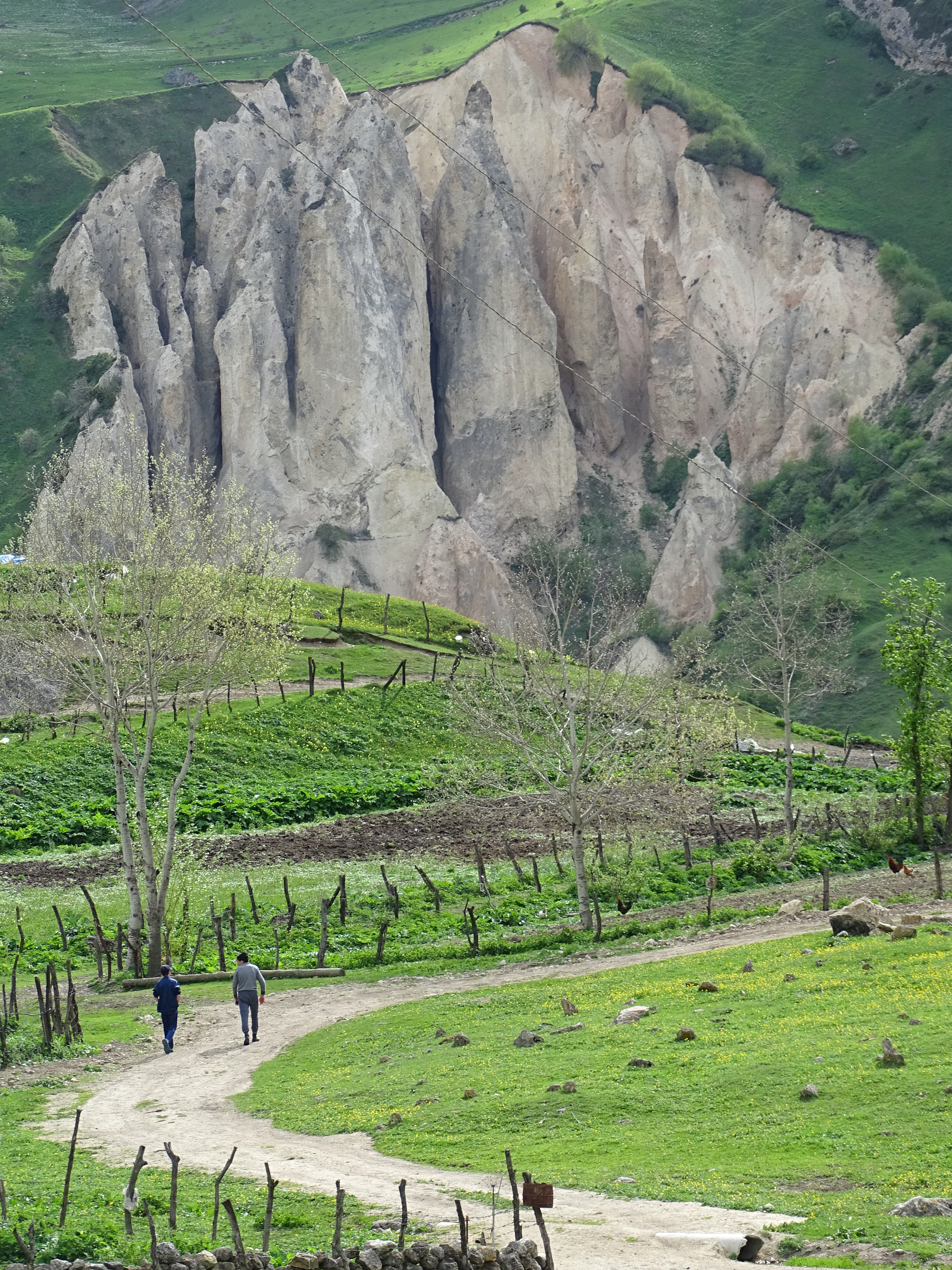
