= Mustafa Qazdal Mosque =

Mosque in Qusar, Azerbaijan

- Azerbaijani: Mustafa Kazdal Məscidi; Arabic: مسجد مصطفى كازدال
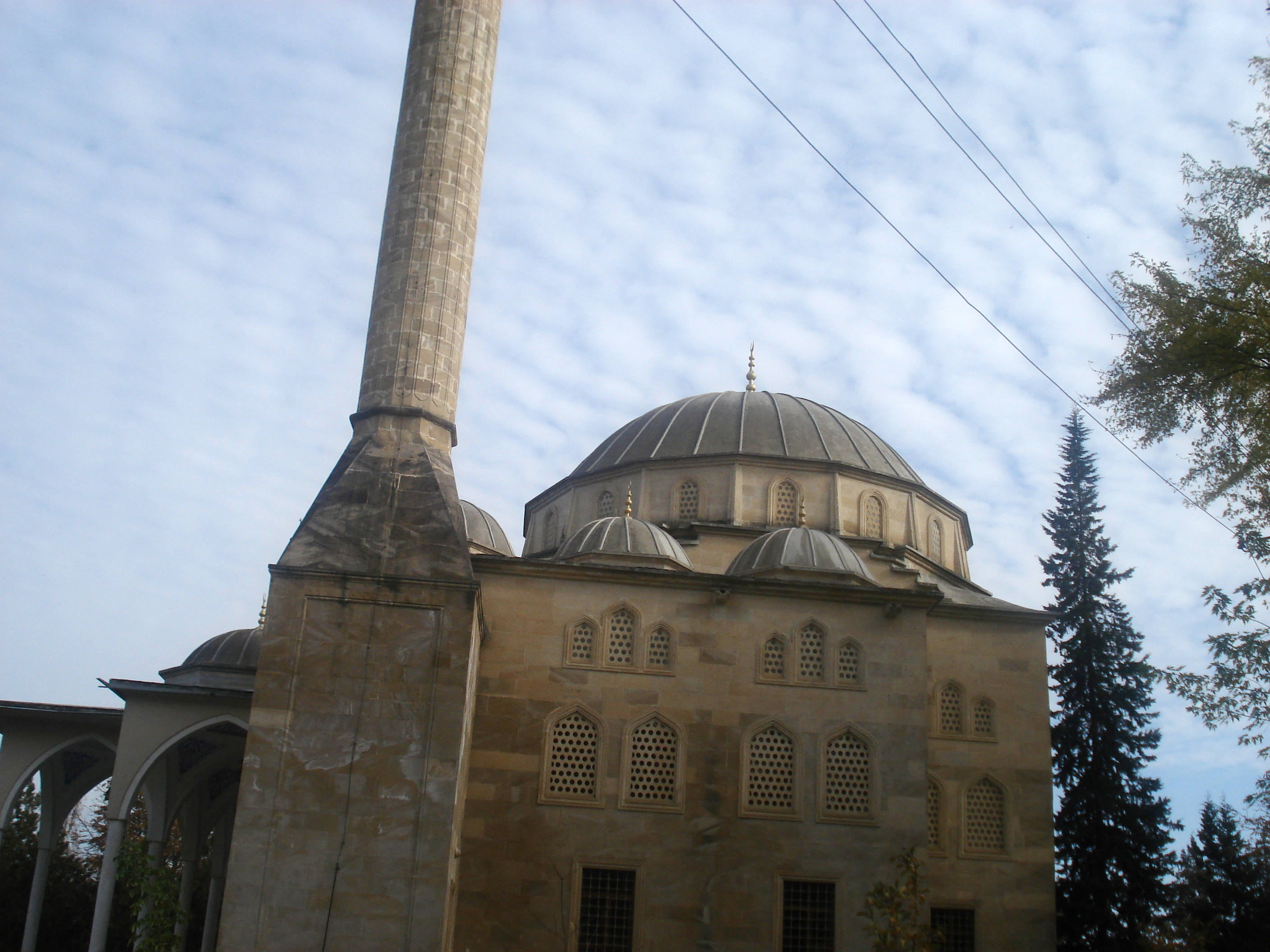
- The mosque in 2008

- Location of the mosque in Azerbaijan

Religion
- Affiliation: Sunni Islam
- Ecclesiastical or organizational status: Mosque
- Status: Active

Location
- Location: Qusar
- Country: Azerbaijan
- Interactive map of Mustafa Qazdal Mosque
- Coordinates: 41°25′00″N 48°15′00″E

Architecture
- Type: Mosque architecture

Specifications
- Dome: Four (maybe more)
- Minaret: One
- Materials: Stone

The Mustafa Qazdal Mosque (Azerbaijani: Mustafa Kazdal Məscidi; Arabic: مسجد مصطفى كازدال) is a Sunni Islam mosque, located in Qusar, Azerbaijan.

== See also ==
- Islam in Azerbaijan
- List of mosques in Azerbaijan
