= Haçatala =

- Municipality
- Location within Azerbaijan
- Coordinates: 41°42′N 48°34′E
- Country: Azerbaijan
- Rayon: Qusar
- Time zone: UTC+4 (AZT)
  - Summer (DST): UTC+5 (AZT)

Haçatala is a village and municipality in the Qusar Rayon of Azerbaijan. It has a population of 271. The municipality consists of the villages of Haçatala and Gican.
