= Gunduzgala Mosque =

Former mosque in Gunduzgala, Azerbaijan

- Azerbaijani: Gündüzqala Məscidi; Arabic: مسجد غوندوزقلا
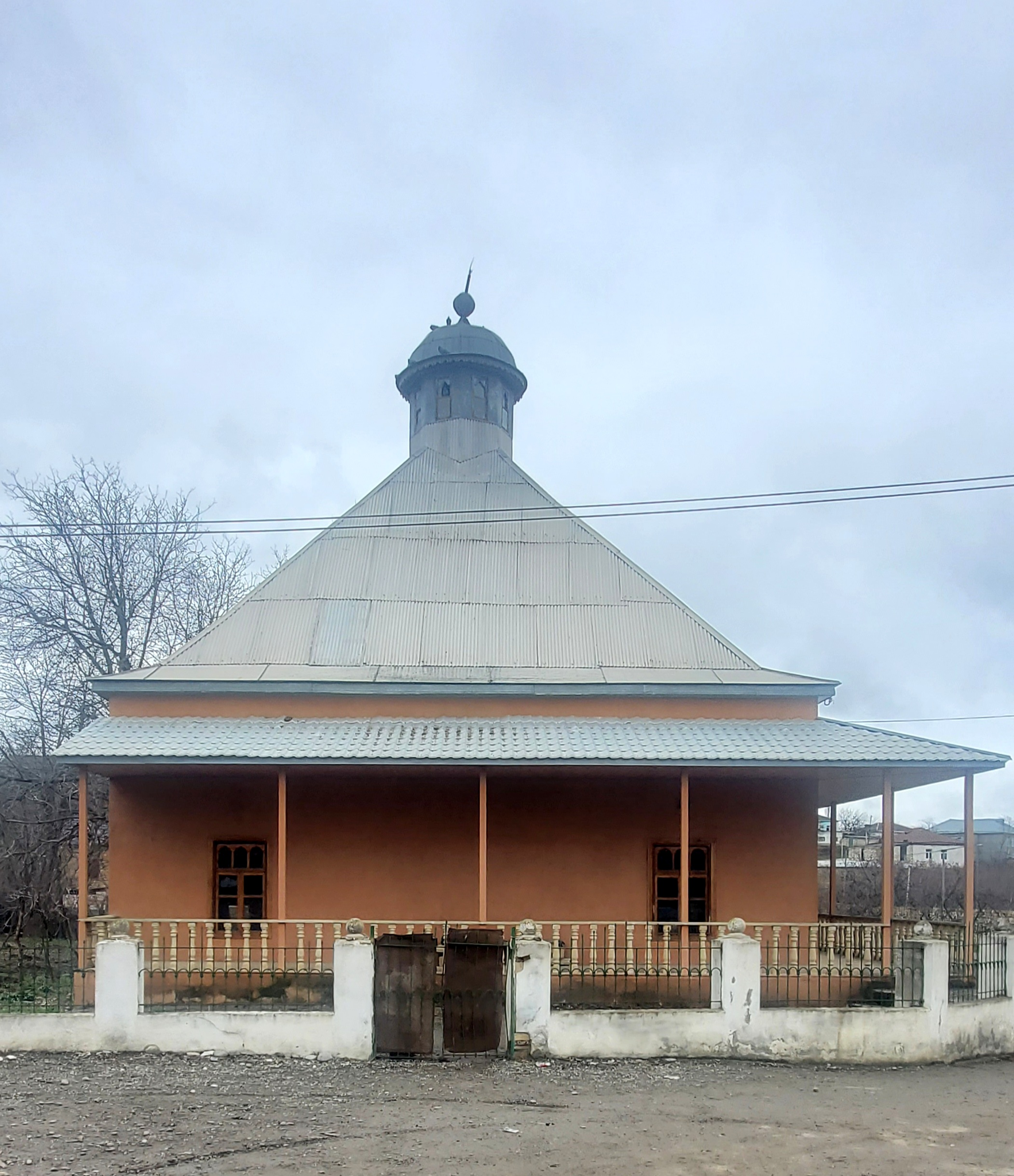
- The former mosque in 2024

- Location of the former mosque in Azerbaijan

Religion
- Affiliation: Islam (former)
- Ecclesiastical or organizational status: Mosque (1912–1928); Profane use (1928–1985)
- Status: Abandoned

Location
- Location: Gündüzqala, Qusar District
- Country: Azerbaijan
- Interactive map of Gunduzgala Mosque
- Coordinates: 41°31′48″N 48°25′46″E

Architecture
- Completed: 1916

Specifications
- Length: 11 m (36 ft)
- Width: 13 m (43 ft)
- Dome: One
- Dome height (outer): 15 m (49 ft)
- Materials: Stone; white metal; timber; slate

The Gunduzgala Mosque (Azerbaijani: Gündüzqala Məscidi; Arabic: مسجد غوندوزقلا) is a former mosque and historical architectural monument, located in the village of Gunduzgala in the Qusar district of Azerbaijan.

Completed in 1916, the mosque was included in the list of immovable historical and cultural monuments of local significance by Decision No. 132 of the Cabinet of Ministers of the Republic of Azerbaijan on August 2, 2001.

== History ==
The Gunduzgala Mosque was built in 1916 in the village of Gündüzqala in the Qusar district.

After the Soviet occupation of Azerbaijan, an official campaign against religion began in 1928. In December of that year, the Central Committee of the Communist Party of Azerbaijan transferred many mosques, churches, and synagogues to the balance of clubs for educational purposes. While there were 3,000 mosques in Azerbaijan in 1917, this number decreased to 1,700 in 1927, 1,369 in 1928, and only 17 by 1933. During this period, Gunduzgala Mosque was closed to worship. The building was initially used as a school and later as a warehouse. Although repairs began on the mosque in 1985, the work was left incomplete due to financial shortages.

After Azerbaijan regained its independence, the mosque was included in the list of immovable historical and cultural monuments of local significance by Decision No. 132 of the Cabinet of Ministers of the Republic of Azerbaijan on August 2, 2001.

As of March 2024, the former mosque was unrestored and non-operational.

== Architecture ==
The mosque, built in a rectangular shape, has an interior area of 11 by 13 m (36 by 43 ft). Its walls are constructed from river stones. The roof is covered with white metal sheets. The floor is made of wood, and the ceiling is finished with wood and slate. The ceiling is supported by two wooden columns. The mosque has seven rectangular windows. Its height is 5 m (16 ft), and the height from the ground to the top of the dome is 15 m (49 ft). The mosque has open balconies on both sides, that are 24 by 1.6 m (78.7 by 5.2 ft) each.

== Gallery ==
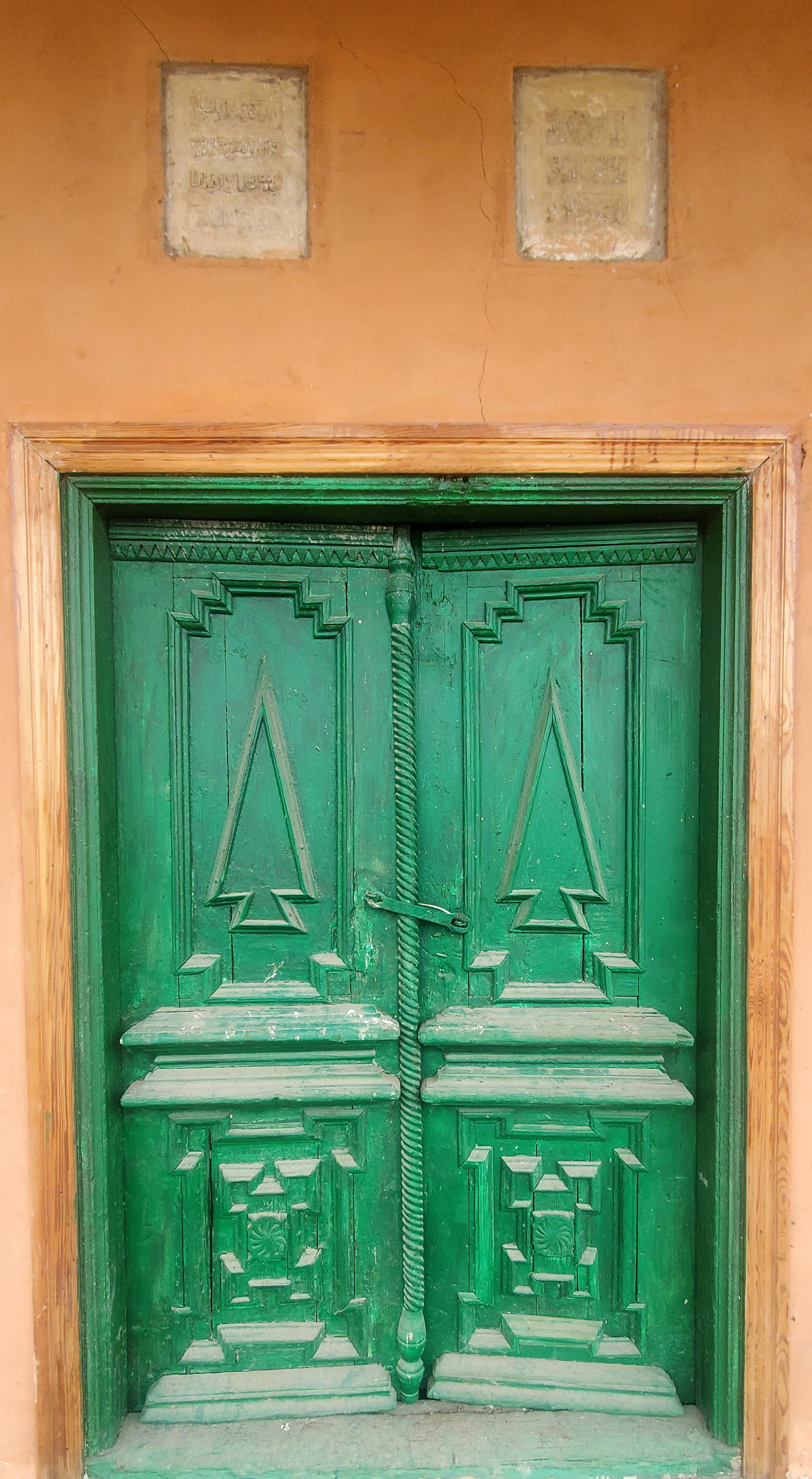

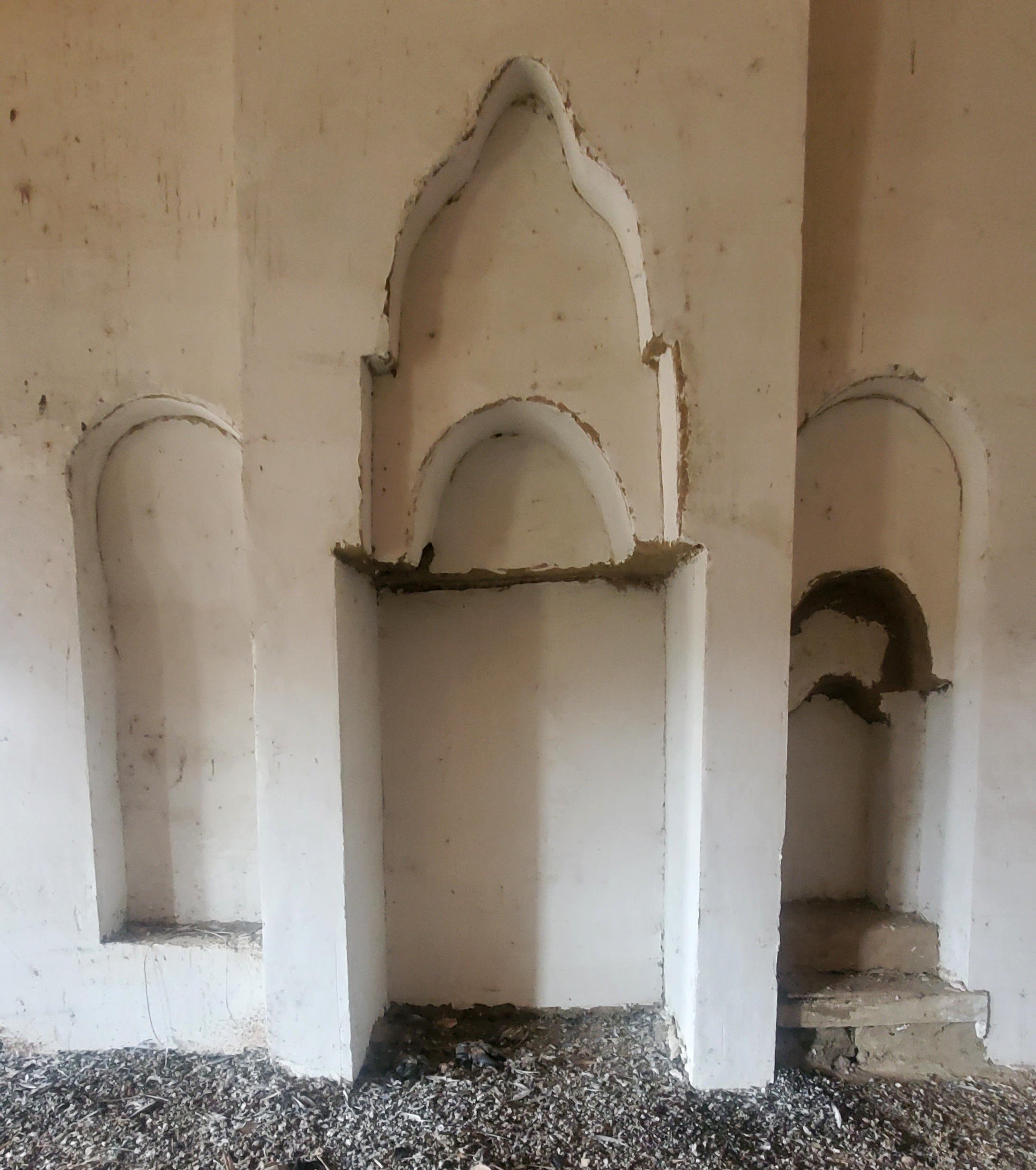

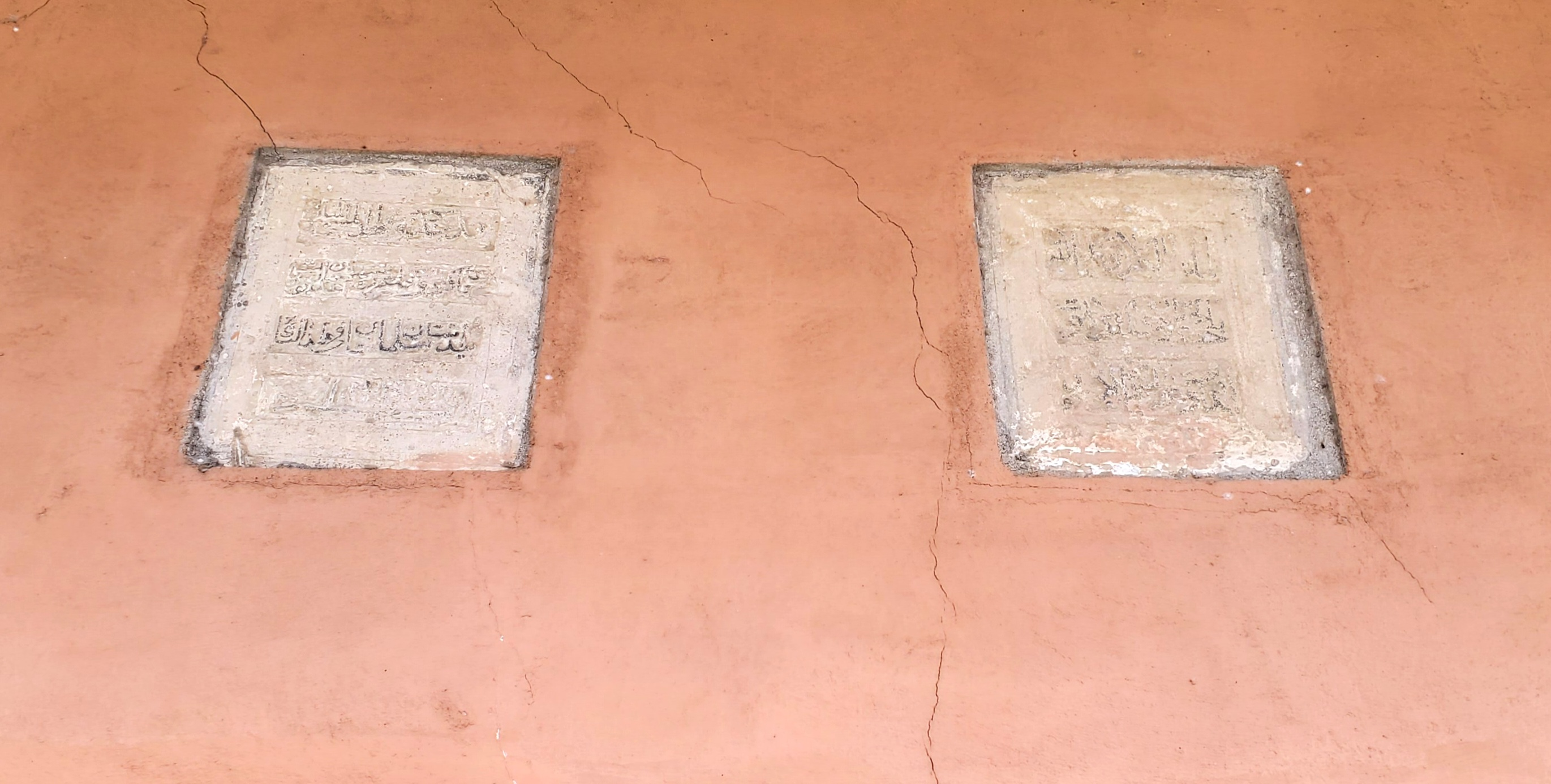

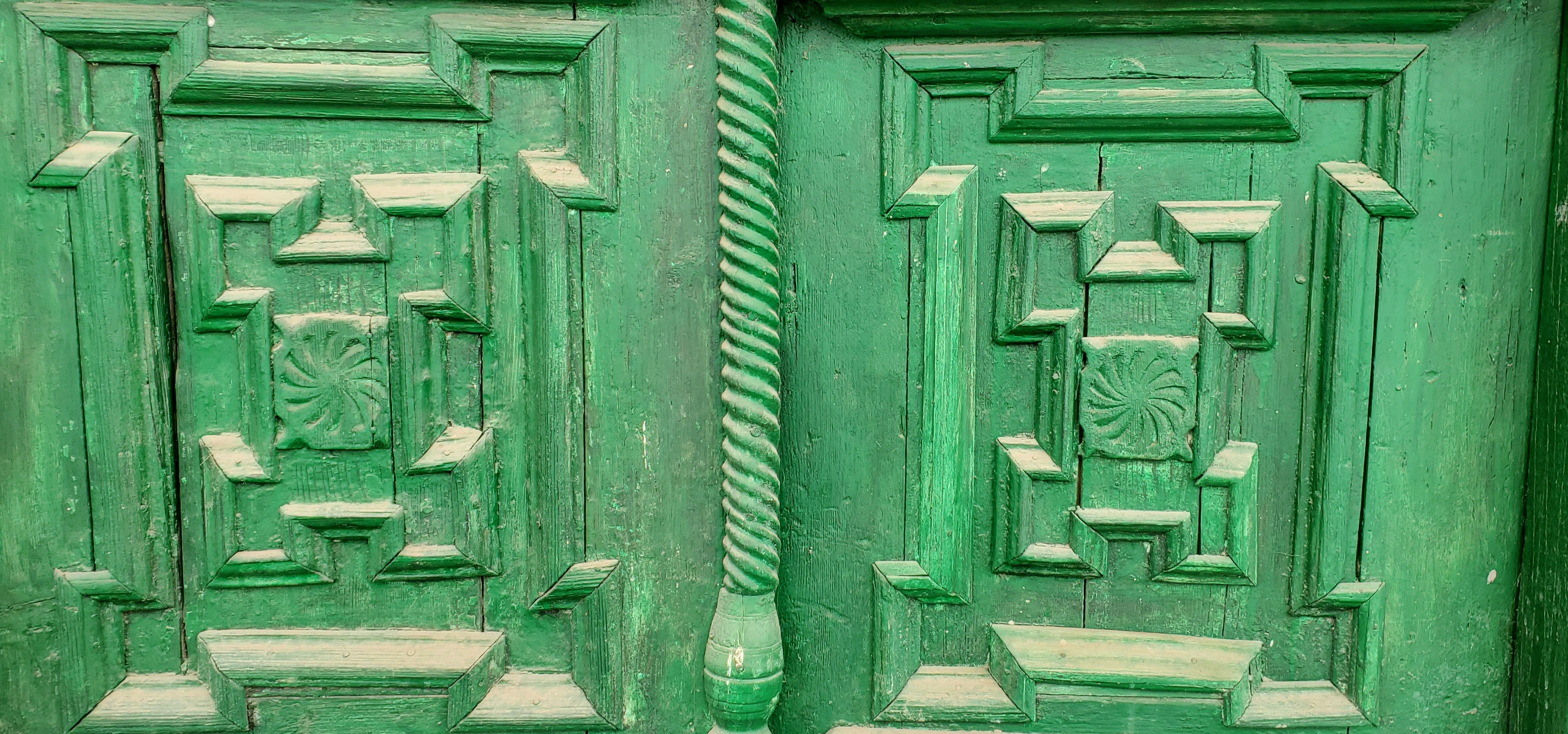

== See also ==
- Islam in Azerbaijan
- List of mosques in Azerbaijan
