= Yerği Kek =

- Municipality
- Azerbaijani: Yerği Kek
- Location within Azerbaijan
- Country: Azerbaijan
- District: Qusar
- Elevation: 2,370 m (7,780 ft)

Population
  - Total: 40
- Time zone: UTC+4 (AZT)
  - Summer (DST): UTC+5 (AZT)

Yerği Kek is a village in the Qusar Rayon of Azerbaijan. The village forms part of the municipality of Sudur.

== Population ==
Ethnic Lezgins live in the village. In the village of Yerği Kek where nearly 40 people live.
