= Sarıhacallı =

- Location within Azerbaijan Location within Shaki-Zagatala Economic Region
- Coordinates: 40°50′08″N 47°39′41″E
- Country: Azerbaijan
- Rayon: Qabala
- Municipality: Dizaxlı
- Time zone: UTC+4 (AZT)
  - Summer (DST): UTC+5 (AZT)

Sarıhacallı (also, Sarı Hacılı, Sargadzhyly, Sari-Gadzhili, and Sarygadzhally) is a village in the Qabala Rayon of Azerbaijan. The village forms part of the municipality of Dizaxlı.
