= Aşağı İmamqulukənd =

Human settlement in Azerbaijan

Coordinates: 41°40′N 48°30′E

Aşağı İmamqulukənd is the Lezgin village and municipality in the Qusar Rayon of Azerbaijan. It has a population of 770. The municipality consists of the villages of Aşağı İmamqulukənd and Mucuqoba.
