= Qusar (city) =

Qusar Ktsar
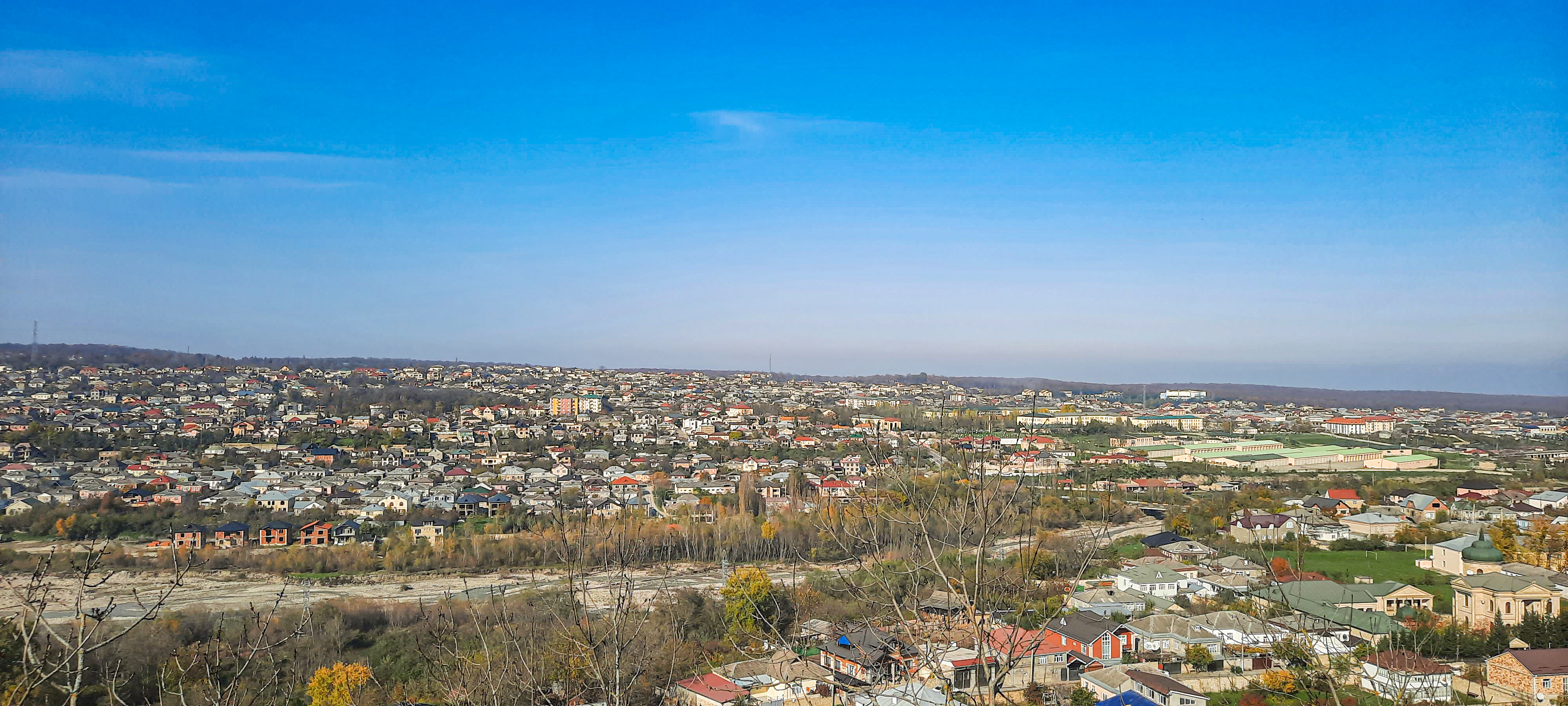
- General view or Qusar city in November 2025

- Location within Azerbaijan
- Coordinates: 41°25′35″N 48°26′08″E
- Country: Azerbaijan
- District: Qusar
- Region: Europe
- Established: 1938
- Elevation: 667 m (2,188 ft)

Population (2023)
  - Total: 21,341
- Time zone: UTC+4 (AZT)
- Area code: +994 2338

Qusar (also Ktsar, Gusar; Azerbaijani: Qusar Azerbaijani pronunciation: [gu'saɾ], Lezgian: Кцlар Lezgian pronunciation: [k'tsaɾ]) is the capital of Qusar District, Azerbaijan. Qusar is located in the foothills of the Greater Caucasus, over the Qusarchay River, 35 kilometers southwest from Khudat railway station and about 180 km from Baku.

== Etymology ==
According to the Oxford Concise Dictionary of World Place-Names, the word literally means "man" and derives from Lezgian kus.

== History ==
=== Caucasian War ===
In 1837-1839, there were uprisings led by imam Muhammad Huluhvi luk and abrek Ali Hilivi in the territory of Kuba province and in the south of Dagestan.

The main reason for the uprising was the intensive displacement of the Lezgin population from Guba, Gusar and Khudat. The selected lands were given to Russian settlers and under military garrisons.

All Lezgin clans of the present-day Gusar district participated in the rebellion, with a total of about 12,000 rebels in the province, Lezgin clans from Southern Dagestan adjacent to the province also participated. By 1839, all pockets of rebel resistance had been suppressed.

=== Lermontov's visit ===
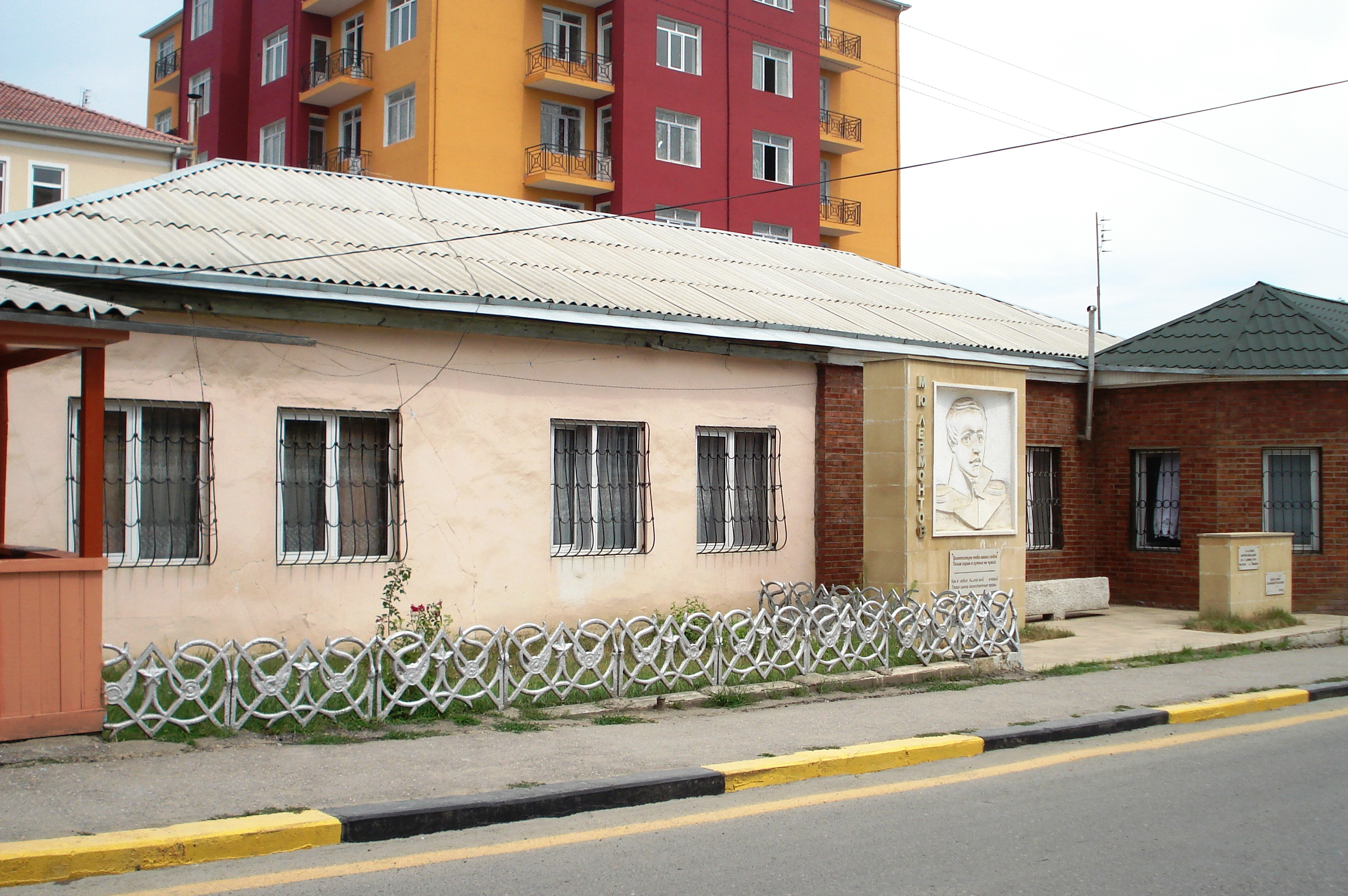
Lermontov's house

In 1836, Mikhail Lermontov visited Qusar, where he met with scientist-philosopher Haji Ali-efendi. There he heard “Ashiq Qarib” dastan from an eminent ashiq Lazgi Ahmad; he later wrote his famous work “Ashiq Qarib” based on its motifs. A home-museum of the poet is reserved in the city with a memorial plate, inscribed with the famous lines of Lermontov:

I welcome you, the hoary Caucasus!
I’m not a stranger for your mountains.
How I loved, my imposing Caucasus,
The martial dispositions of your sons.

=== 20th century ===
In 1938, Qusar settlement acquired a city status.

== Geography ==
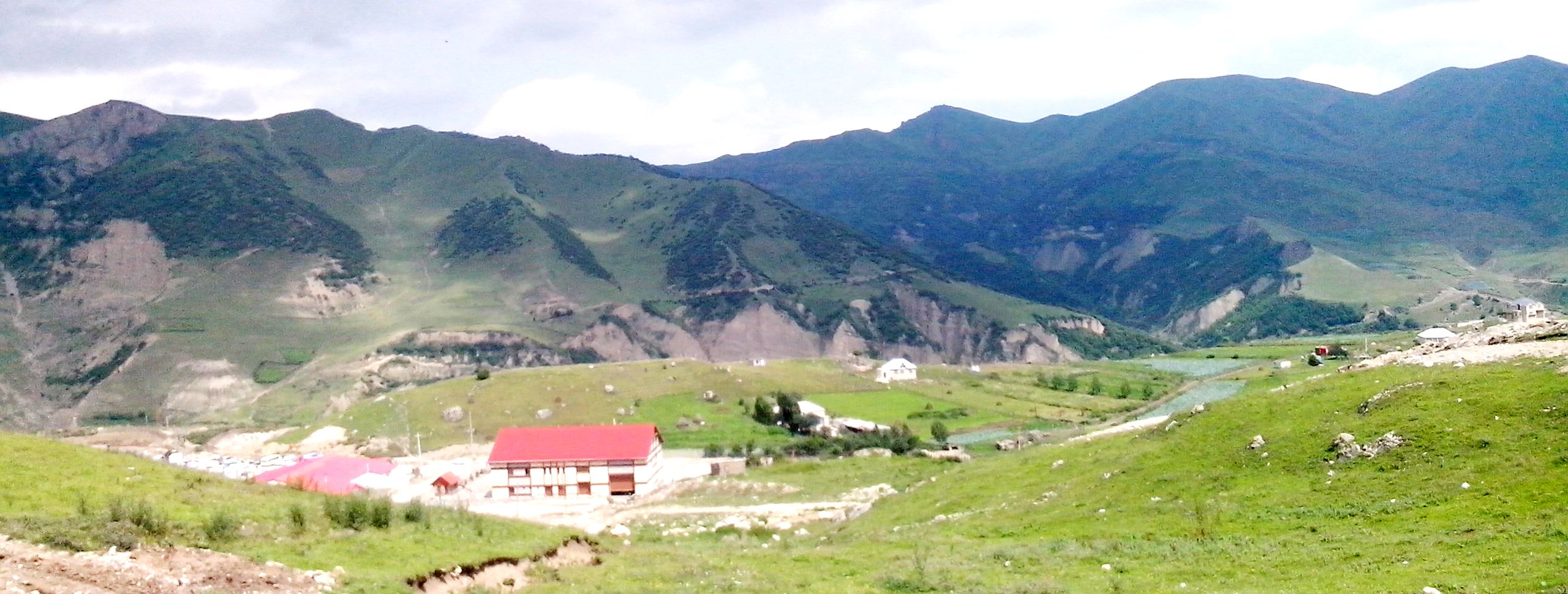
Qusar

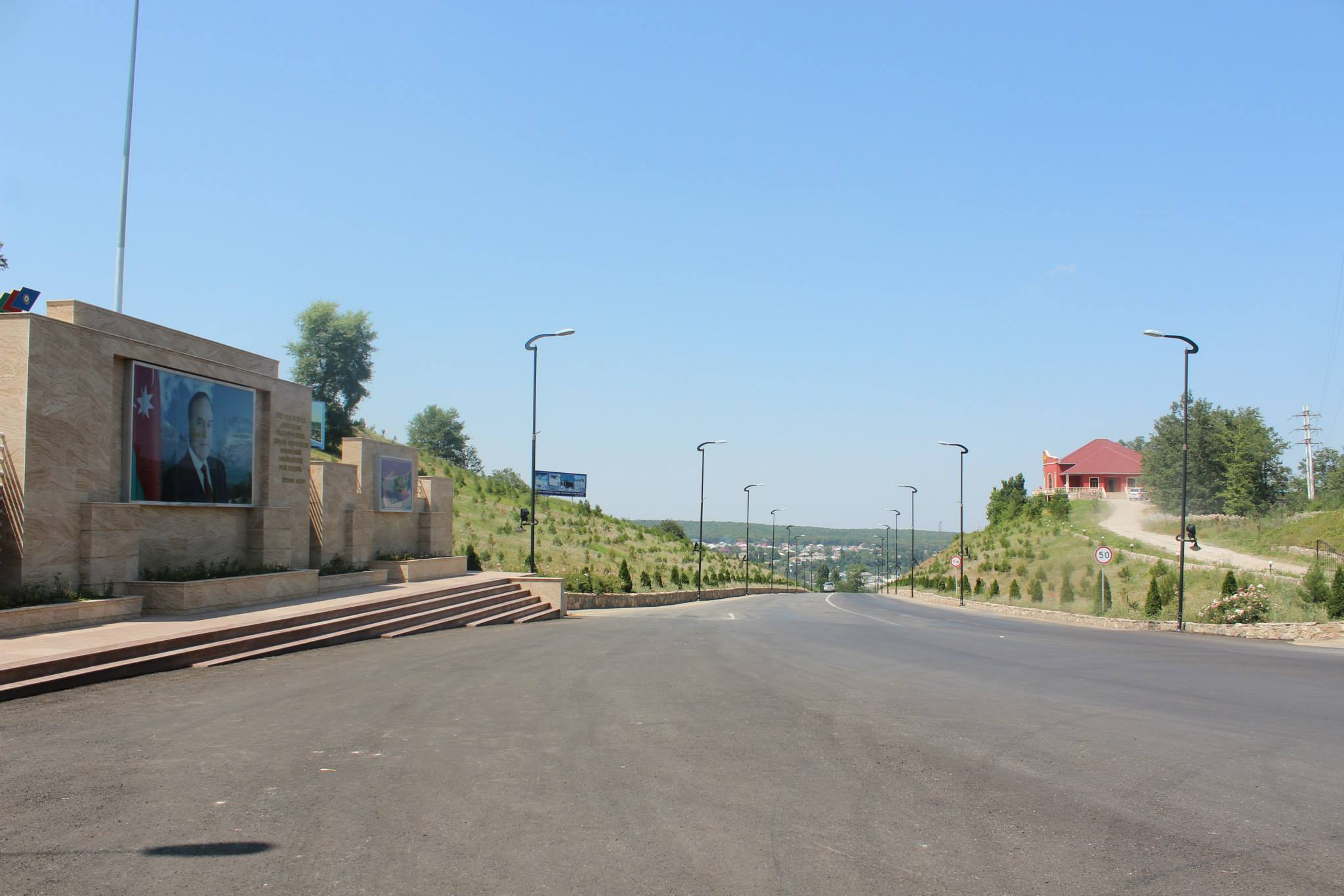
Qusar park

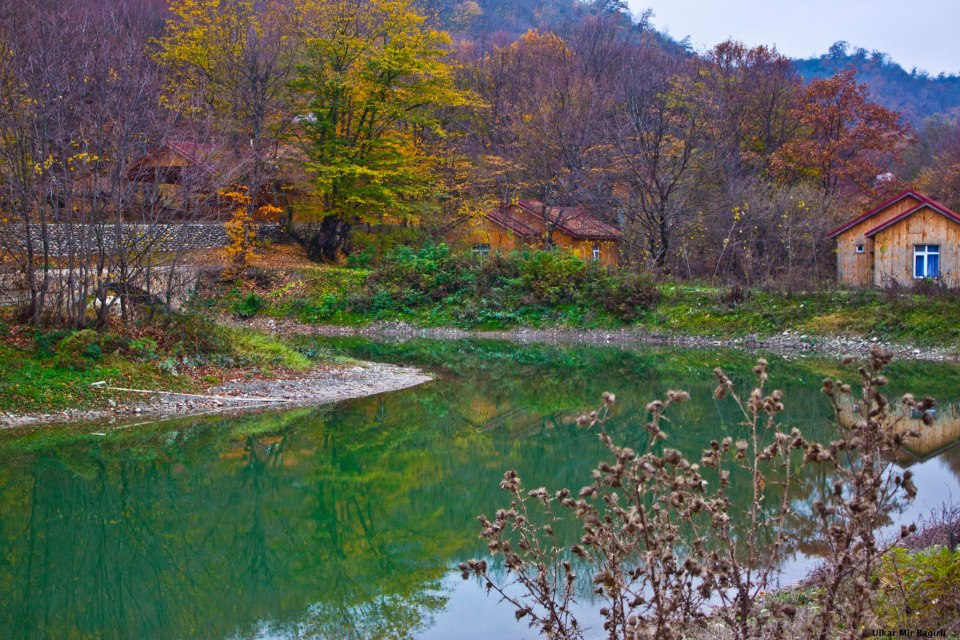
Qusar (City)

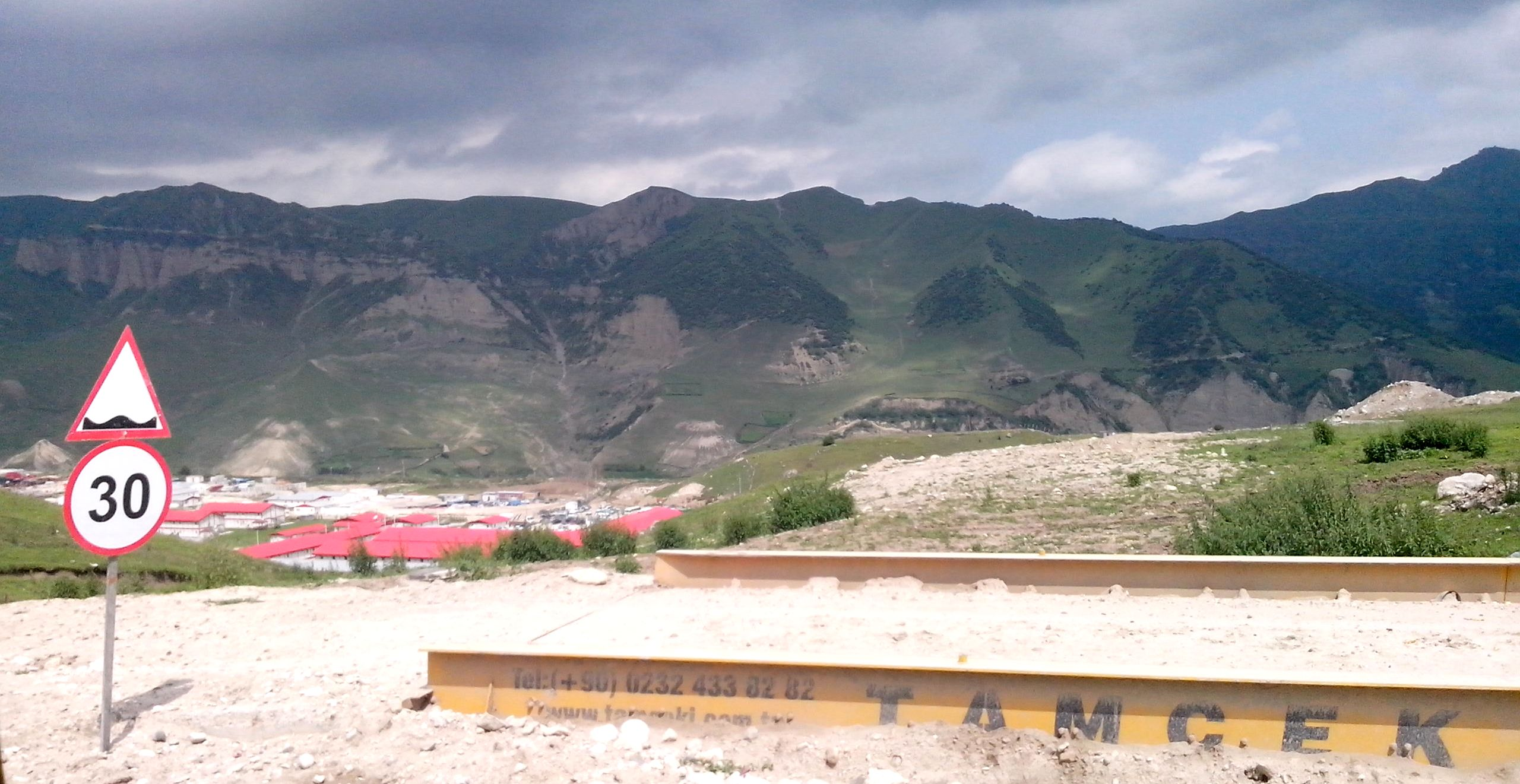
Qusar

The city is located not far from Bazarduzu, Shahdagh Mountains and a border with Russia. The mountain river Qusarchay, in honor of which the city acquired its name, flows in Qusar. There is also an artificial lake, Fialka.

=== Climate ===
Qusar is located in a zone of subtropical climate and the northern part of the rayon is in zone of mild climate. But because of the heights above the sea level and proximity of the mountains winter is always cold here, and summer is not hot. Temperature of air can change more than 15 degrees during a day. For instance, in summer incessant days-long rains can begin after hot weather.

== Demographics ==
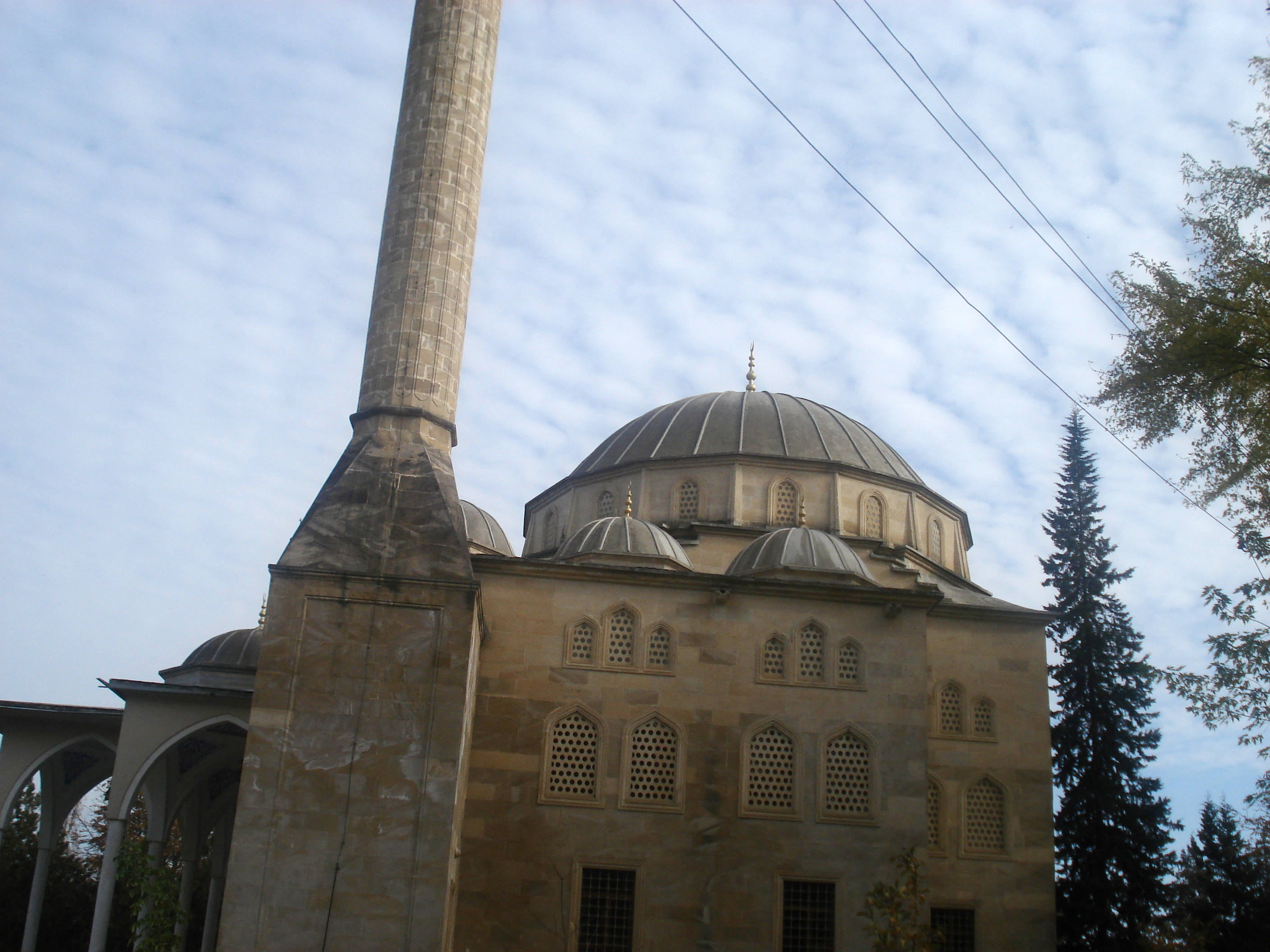
Mustafa Qazdal Mosque is a Sunni Muslim mosque in Qusar, Azerbaijan.

According to the 1916 publication of the Caucasian Calendar, there lived 1,203 people, primarily Russians in Qusar. In 1926, there were 120 Mountain Jews, a number which had increased to 241 by 1939.

According to a census of 1959, at least 7366 people lived in Qusar. According to a census of 1979, population of the city consisted of 12225 people, and in 1989 it reached 14230.

97% of the population consists of Lezgins.

== Economy ==
The economy of Qusar is partially agricultural, partially tourist based, with some industries in operation. There are tinned food, milk and asphalt factories in the city.

=== Tourism and shopping ===
Shahdag Hotel and Spa

Qusar is home to Shahdag Winter Complex, the largest ski resort in Azerbaijan. Other mountain ranges are popular among tourists.

== Culture ==
Local history museum was established in 1980 and moved into its current building with an area of 1652 sq.m. in 1982. There are 3700 exhibits in the museum.

The Qusar State Art Gallery opened in 1986 in Hil village of Qusar raion was moved to Qusar city in 1998 . 152 works of Azerbaijani artists, including 111 paintings, 34 graphic and 7 sculptural works are on display in the gallery.

In 1998, the State Drama Theatre of Lezgins was opened in Qusar.

Heydar Aliyev Center was built in Heydar Aliyev Memorial Complex in 2012 with the aim of organizing different events and involving young people in various career and personal development activities. The Center features a memorial museum, a library, a reading hall, different conference rooms, and dance, carpet-weaving training centers.

=== Parks and gardens ===
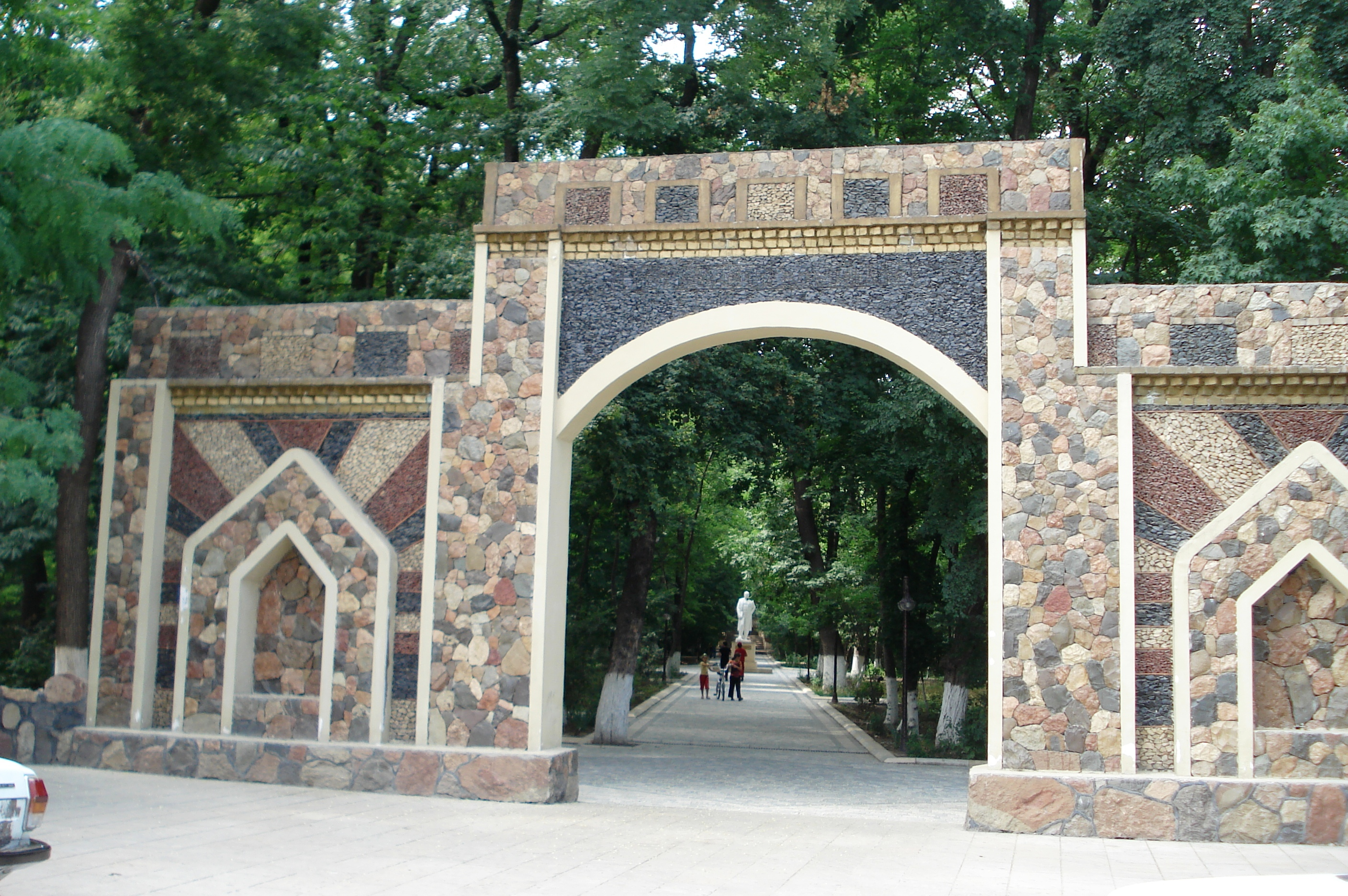
Entrance to Nariman Narimanov Park

Qusar has plenty of parks and gardens, mostly well maintained. The Nariman Narimanov Park is one of the most scenic parks in the city.

=== Sports ===
Qusar Olympic Sports Complex

The city has one professional football team, Shahdag Qusar, currently competing in the second-flight of Azerbaijani football, the Azerbaijan First Division.

== Transport ==
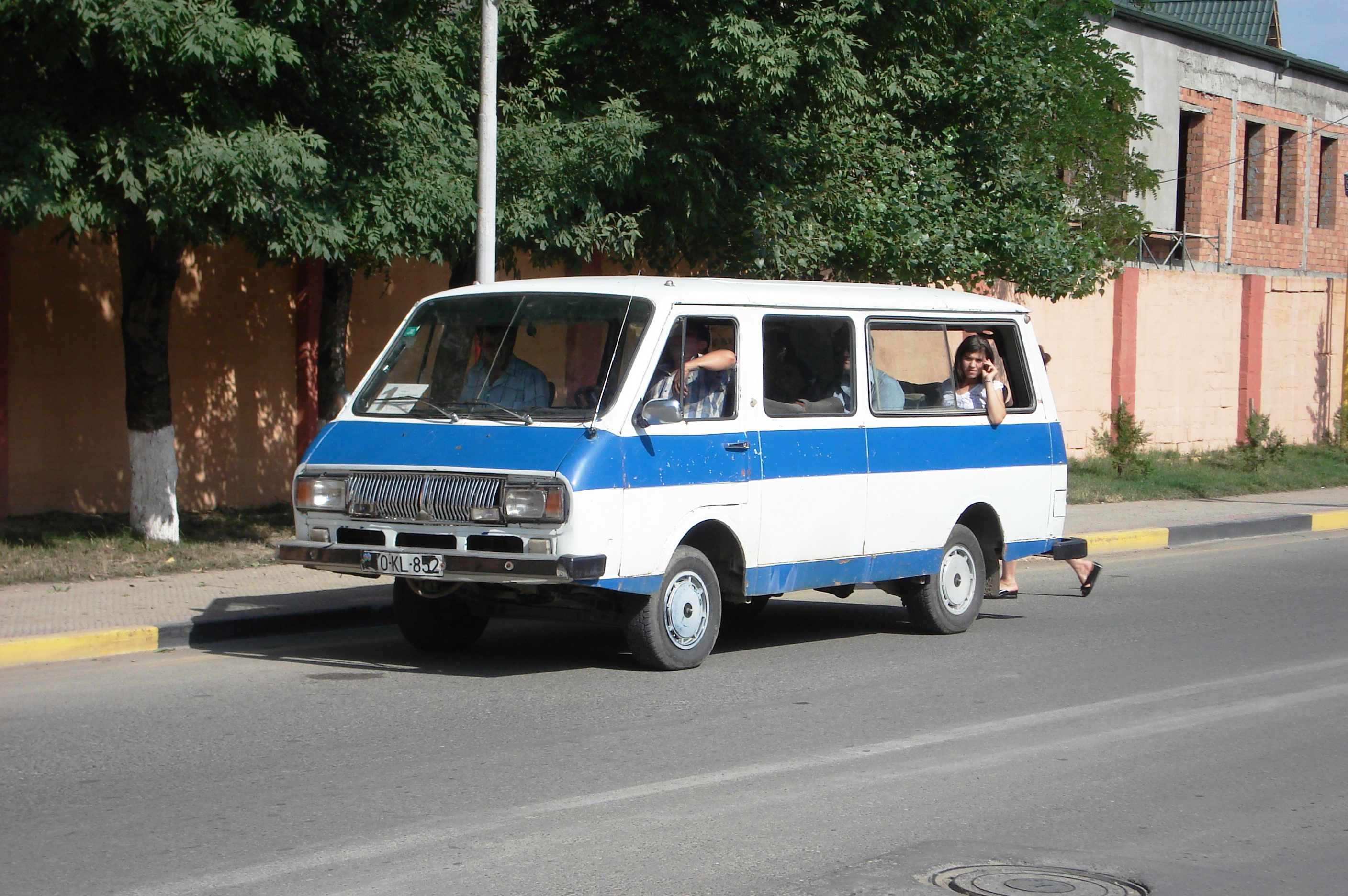
RAF-2203 minibuses used by public as fixed-run taxis in 2009

Qusar's urban transport system is managed by the Ministry of Transportation. Bus rides cost 0.5 AZN.

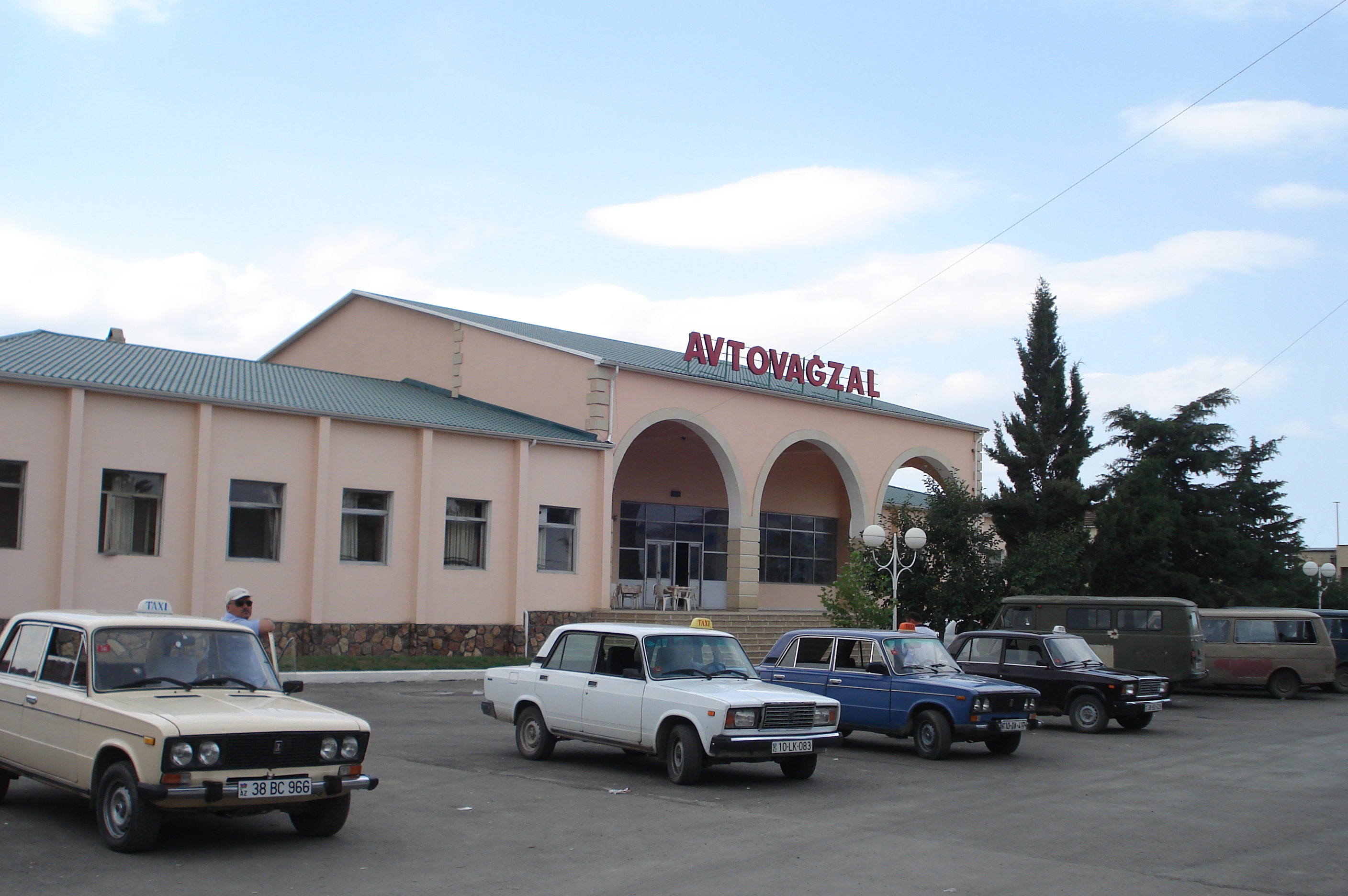
Qusar bus station in 2009

== Education ==
In 2008, 6 secondary schools, one of which functions in Azerbaijani and 5 in Russian language, were operating in the city. There are also two state run preschools and one private preschool, Panda School, as well as Azerbaijan State Pedagogical College, which trains future teachers of Azerbaijani, English, and elementary school. As of 2016 there are three language schools in the city. The most popular one, Apex English Language School, has been operating in Qusar since 2013.

== Honorable residents ==
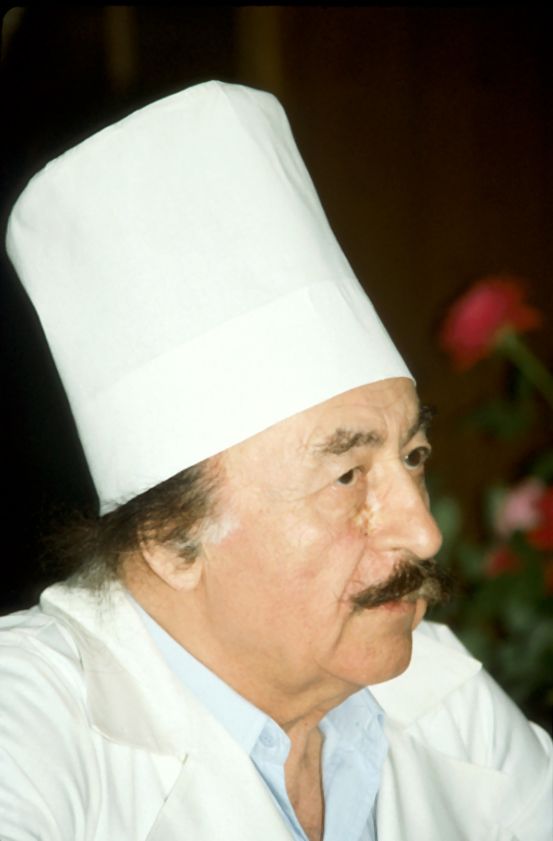
Gavriil Ilizarov

- Makhmud Abilov, Soviet major general, who fought in the Soviet-Georgian War and World War II.
- Rafael Amirbekov, footballer, Baku FC's player
- Rahid Amirguliyev, footballer, Khazar Lankaran's player
- Farida Azizova, taekwondo practitioner
- Timofey Borshev, People's Commissar of International Affairs of the Turkmen SSR (1938-1942).
- Gavriil Ilizarov, Soviet physician, known for inventing the Ilizarov apparatus for lengthening limb bones and for his eponymous surgery.
- Sedaget Kerimova, Lezgin writer, poet and journalist.
- Asya Manafova, politician of the New Azerbaijan Party
