= Sudur =

- Municipality
- Location within Azerbaijan
- Coordinates: 41°22′40″N 48°02′08″E
- Country: Azerbaijan
- Rayon: Qusar

Population
  - Total: 568
- Time zone: UTC+4 (AZT)
  - Summer (DST): UTC+5 (AZT)

Sudur is a village and municipality in the Qusar Rayon of Azerbaijan. It has a population of 568. The municipality consists of the villages of Sudur, Quxur, and Yerği Kek.
