= Quxur =

- Location within Azerbaijan
- Coordinates: 41°23′38″N 48°02′15″E
- Country: Azerbaijan
- Rayon: Qusar
- Municipality: Sudur
- Time zone: UTC+4 (AZT)
  - Summer (DST): UTC+5 (AZT)

Quxur (also, Quxuroba and Kukhur) is a village in the Qusar Rayon of Azerbaijan. The village forms part of the municipality of Sudur.
