= Suduroba =

Human settlement in Azerbaijan

Coordinates: 41°35′N 48°26′E

Suduroba is a village in the municipality of İmamqulukənd in the Qusar Rayon of Azerbaijan.
