= Mucuq =

- Municipality
- Location within Azerbaijan
- Coordinates: 41°27′29″N 48°13′25″E
- Country: Azerbaijan
- Rayon: Qusar

Population
  - Total: 1,243
- Time zone: UTC+4 (AZT)
  - Summer (DST): UTC+5 (AZT)

Mucuq (also, Mudzhuk and Mudzhukh) is a village and municipality in the Qusar Rayon of Azerbaijan. It has a population of 1,243.
