= Gilah =

- Location within Azerbaijan
- Coordinates: 41°28′54″N 48°10′44″E
- Country: Azerbaijan
- Rayon: Qusar
- Municipality: Xuluq
- Time zone: UTC+4 (AZT)
  - Summer (DST): UTC+5 (AZT)

Gilah (also, Gilakh) is a village in the Qusar Rayon of Azerbaijan. The village forms part of the municipality of Xuluq.
