= Urvaoba =

Coordinates: 41°33′N 48°36′E

Urvaoba is a village in the municipality of Urva in the Qusar Rayon of Azerbaijan.
