= Aşağı Qələnxur =

- Location within Azerbaijan
- Coordinates: 41°29′43″N 48°09′03″E
- Country: Azerbaijan
- Rayon: Qusar
- Municipality: Nəcəfkənd
- Time zone: UTC+4 (AZT)
  - Summer (DST): UTC+5 (AZT)

Aşağı Qələnxur (also, Aşağı Gələnxur and Ashagy Gelenkhur) is a village in the Qusar Rayon of Azerbaijan. The village forms part of the municipality of Nəcəfkənd.
