= Yeni Dizaxlı =

Village in Qabala Rayon, Azerbaijan

Coordinates: 40°51′27″N 47°40′37″E

Yeni Dizaxlı is a village and municipality in the Qabala Rayon of Azerbaijan. It has a population of 2,110.
