= Kufoba =

- Municipality
- Location within Azerbaijan
- Coordinates: 41°40′39″N 48°28′02″E
- Country: Azerbaijan
- Rayon: Qusar

Population
  - Total: 438
- Time zone: UTC+4 (AZT)
  - Summer (DST): UTC+5 (AZT)

Kufoba is a village and municipality in the Qusar Rayon of Azerbaijan, established in 1999. As of the 2009 census, it has a population of 438.
