= Yasaboba =

- Municipality
- Location within Azerbaijan
- Coordinates: 41°38′27″N 48°34′52″E
- Country: Azerbaijan
- Rayon: Qusar

Population
  - Total: 488
- Time zone: UTC+4 (AZT)
  - Summer (DST): UTC+5 (AZT)

Yasaboba is a village and municipality in the Qusar Rayon of Azerbaijan. It has a population of 488.
