= Gilahoba =

- Municipality
- Location within Azerbaijan
- Coordinates: 41°43′31″N 48°34′27″E
- Country: Azerbaijan
- Rayon: Qusar

Population
  - Total: 504
- Time zone: UTC+4 (AZT)
  - Summer (DST): UTC+5 (AZT)

Gilahoba (also, Kelakhoba) is a village and municipality in the Qusar Rayon of Azerbaijan. It has a population of 504.
