= Dizaxlı =

- Municipality
- Location within Azerbaijan Location within Shaki-Zagatala Economic Region
- Coordinates: 40°51′32″N 47°41′45″E
- Country: Azerbaijan
- Rayon: Qabala

Population
  - Total: 525
- Time zone: UTC+4 (AZT)
  - Summer (DST): UTC+5 (AZT)

Dizaxlı (also, Dizakhly and Dızaxlı) is a village and municipality in the Qabala Rayon of Azerbaijan. It has a population of 525. The municipality consists of the villages of Dizaxlı and Sarıhacallı.
