= Piral =

- Municipality
- Location within Azerbaijan
- Coordinates: 41°29′46″N 48°17′24″E
- Country: Azerbaijan
- Rayon: Qusar

Population
  - Total: 1,944
- Time zone: UTC+4 (AZT)
  - Summer (DST): UTC+5 (AZT)

Piral is a village and municipality in the Qusar Rayon of Azerbaijan. It has a population of 1,944. The postal code is AZ3833.
