= Yuxarı Qələnxur =

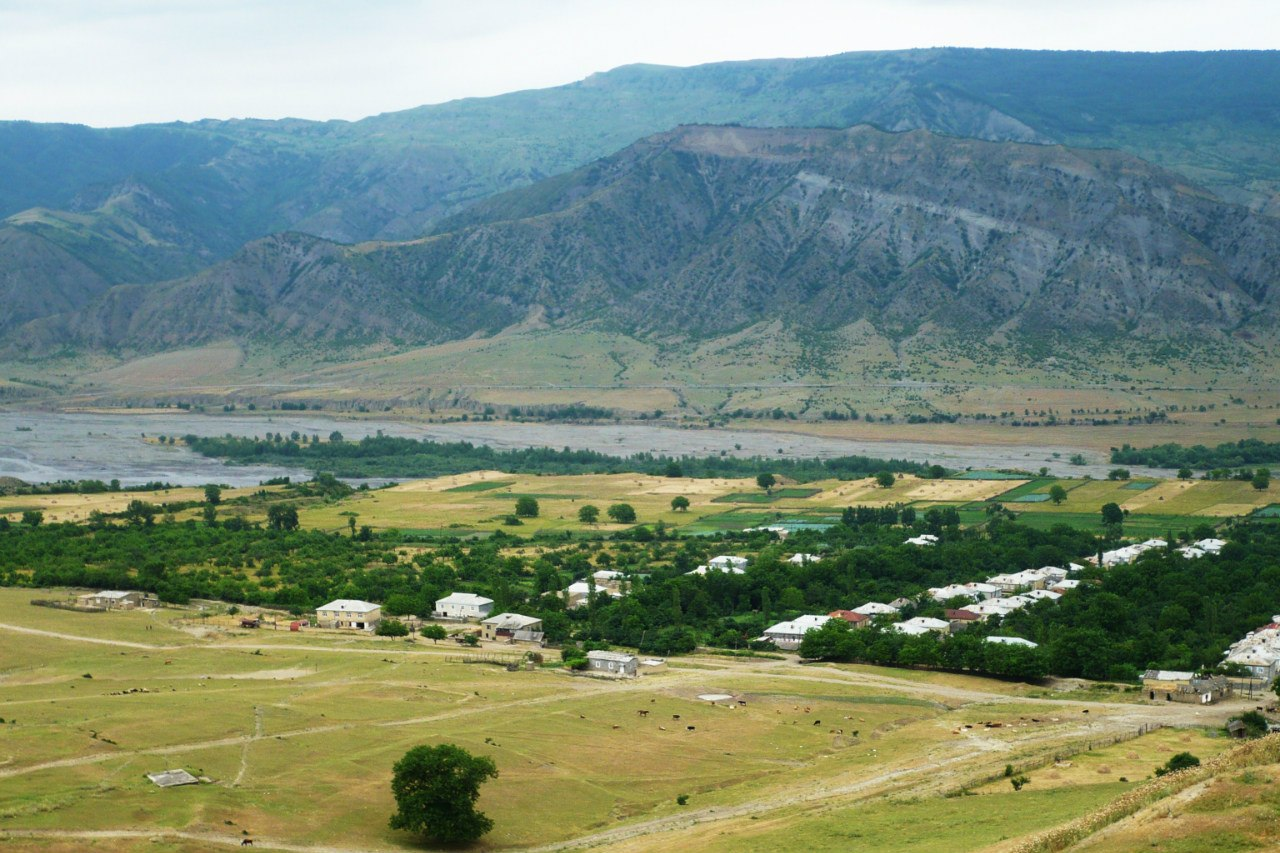
Yuxarı Qələnxur
- Municipality
- Location within Azerbaijan
- Coordinates: 41°29′10″N 48°07′49″E
- Country: Azerbaijan
- Rayon: Qusar

Population
  - Total: 531
- Time zone: UTC+4 (AZT)
  - Summer (DST): UTC+5 (AZT)

Yuxarı Qələnxur (also, Yukhary-Gelenkhur) is a village and municipality in the Qusar Rayon of Azerbaijan. It has a population of 531.
