= Sumağallı =

- Municipality
- Location within Azerbaijan
- Coordinates: 40°55′05″N 48°02′42″E
- Country: Azerbaijan
- Rayon: Ismailli

Population
  - Total: 734
- Time zone: UTC+4 (AZT)
  - Summer (DST): UTC+5 (AZT)

Sumağallı (also, Sumaqallı, Sumagally, and Sumakhly) is a village and municipality in the Ismailli Rayon of Azerbaijan. It has a population of 734.
