= Caqarqışlaq =

Coordinates: 41°33′N 48°33′E

Caqarqışlaq is a village and municipality in the Qusar Rayon of Azerbaijan. It has a population of 615.
