= Əniqoba =

- Municipality
- Location within Azerbaijan
- Coordinates: 41°38′N 48°30′E
- Country: Azerbaijan
- Rayon: Qusar

Population
  - Total: 737
- Time zone: UTC+4 (AZT)
  - Summer (DST): UTC+5 (AZT)

Əniqoba (also, Anykhoba and Anykhoba Pervaya) is a village and municipality in the Qusar Rayon of Azerbaijan. It has a population of 737. The municipality consists of the villages of Əniqoba and Xuluqoba.
