= Zindanmuruqqışlaq =

- Municipality
- Location within Azerbaijan
- Coordinates: 41°29′N 48°36′E
- Country: Azerbaijan
- Rayon: Qusar

Population
  - Total: 434
- Time zone: UTC+4 (AZT)
  - Summer (DST): UTC+5 (AZT)

Zindanmuruqqışlaq (also, Zindanmurugkyshlak) is a village and municipality in the Qusar Rayon of Azerbaijan. It has a population of 434.
