= Qaratoba =

- Municipality
- Location within Azerbaijan
- Coordinates: 41°42′51″N 48°33′55″E
- Country: Azerbaijan
- Rayon: Qusar

Population
  - Total: 637
- Time zone: UTC+4 (AZT)
  - Summer (DST): UTC+5 (AZT)

Qaratoba (also, Karatoba) is a village and municipality in the Qusar Rayon of Azerbaijan. It has a population of 637.
