= Əvəcük =

- Municipality
- Location within Azerbaijan
- Coordinates: 41°28′15″N 48°23′43″E
- Country: Azerbaijan
- Rayon: Qusar

Population
  - Total: 863
- Time zone: UTC+4 (AZT)
  - Summer (DST): UTC+5 (AZT)

Əvəcük (also, Evadzhuk and Evedzhyuk) is a village and municipality in the Qusar Rayon of Azerbaijan. It has a population of 863.
