= Caqar =

- Municipality
- Location within Azerbaijan
- Coordinates: 41°20′38″N 48°11′58″E
- Country: Azerbaijan
- Rayon: Qusar

Population
  - Total: 371
- Time zone: UTC+4 (AZT)
  - Summer (DST): UTC+5 (AZT)

Caqar (also, Dzhagar) is a village and municipality in the Qusar Rayon of Azerbaijan. It has a population of 371.
