= Çətgün =

- Location within Azerbaijan
- Coordinates: 41°20′N 48°10′E
- Country: Azerbaijan
- Rayon: Qusar
- Municipality: Kuzun
- Time zone: UTC+4 (AZT)
  - Summer (DST): UTC+5 (AZT)

Çətgün (also, Chetgyun) is a village in the Qusar Rayon of Azerbaijan. The village forms part of the municipality of Kuzun.
