= Acaxur =

Əcəxur
- Municipality
- Location within Azerbaijan
- Coordinates: 41°27′18″N 48°11′20″E
- Country: Azerbaijan
- Rayon: Qusar

Population
  - Total: 786
- Time zone: UTC+4 (AZT)
  - Summer (DST): UTC+5 (AZT)

Əcəxur (also, Adzhakhur and Adzhkhur) is a village and municipality in the Qusar Rayon of Azerbaijan. It has a population of 786. The municipality consists of the villages of Əcəxur and Əcəxuroba.
