= Quxuroba =

- Municipality
- Location within Azerbaijan
- Coordinates: 41°35′17″N 48°32′31″E
- Country: Azerbaijan
- Rayon: Qusar

Population
  - Total: 1,980
- Time zone: UTC+4 (AZT)
  - Summer (DST): UTC+5 (AZT)

Quxuroba (also, Kukhuroba and Kukhur-Kishlag) is a village and municipality in the Qusar Rayon of Azerbaijan. It has a population of 1,980.
