= Urva, Azerbaijan =

Village in Azerbaijan

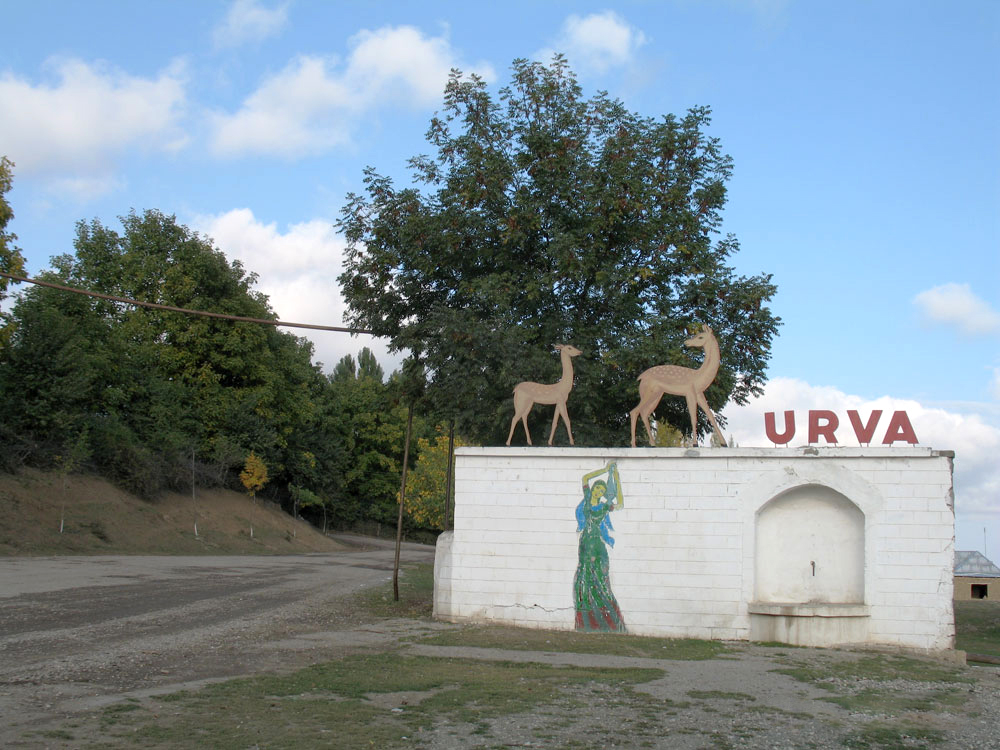
Urva
- Municipality
- Location within Azerbaijan
- Coordinates: 41°24′00″N 48°20′12″E
- Country: Azerbaijan
- Rayon: Qusar

Population
  - Total: 2,472
- Time zone: UTC+4 (AZT)
  - Summer (DST): UTC+5 (AZT)

Urva (also, Urvan, Lezgian: Вурвар) is a village and municipality in the Qusar Rayon of Azerbaijan. It has a population of 2,472. The municipality consists of the villages of Urva and Urvaoba. In 1908, Urva had 1,015 residents, all of them Lezgins.
