= Əcəxuroba =

- Location within Azerbaijan
- Coordinates: 41°43′N 48°32′E
- Country: Azerbaijan
- Rayon: Qusar
- Municipality: Əcəxur
- Time zone: UTC+4 (AZT)
  - Summer (DST): UTC+5 (AZT)

Əcəxuroba (also, Adzhakhuroba) is a village in the Qusar Rayon of Azerbaijan. The village forms part of the municipality of Əcəxur.
