= Kuzunqışlaq =

- Municipality
- Location within Azerbaijan
- Coordinates: 41°30′09″N 48°37′02″E
- Country: Azerbaijan
- Rayon: Qusar

Population
  - Total: 1,052
- Time zone: UTC+4 (AZT)
  - Summer (DST): UTC+5 (AZT)

Kuzunqışlaq (also, Kuzunkyshlak and Kuzunkyshlakh) is a village and municipality in the Qusar Rayon of Azerbaijan. It has a population of 1,052.
