= Mucuqoba =

- Village
- Location within Azerbaijan
- Coordinates: 41.67760°N 48.50110°E
- Country: Azerbaijan
- Rayon: Qusar
- Time zone: UTC+4 (AZT)
  - Summer (DST): UTC+5 (AZT)

Mucuqoba is a village in the municipality of Aşağı İmamqulukənd in the Qusar Rayon of Azerbaijan.
