= Xuluqoba =

- Location within Azerbaijan
- Coordinates: 41°40′41″N 48°33′44″E
- Country: Azerbaijan
- Rayon: Qusar
- Municipality: Əniqoba
- Time zone: UTC+4 (AZT)
  - Summer (DST): UTC+5 (AZT)

Xuluqoba (also, Khulug and Khulukhoba) is a village in the Qusar Rayon of Azerbaijan. The village forms part of the municipality of Əniqoba.
