= Qəmərvan =

- Municipality
- Location within Azerbaijan Location within Shaki-Zagatala Economic Region
- Coordinates: 41°03′47″N 47°47′31″E
- Country: Azerbaijan
- Rayon: Qabala

Population
  - Total: 1,839
- Time zone: UTC+4 (AZT)
  - Summer (DST): UTC+5 (AZT)

Qəmərvan (also, Kemervan) is a village and municipality in the Qabala Rayon of Azerbaijan. It has a population of 1,839.
