= Minaxür =

Azeri Village

Coordinates: 41°31′N 48°33′E

Minaxür is a village and the least populous municipality in the Qusar Rayon of Azerbaijan. It has a population of 242.
