= Xuluq =

- Municipality
- Location within Azerbaijan
- Coordinates: 41°28′11″N 48°09′23″E
- Country: Azerbaijan
- Rayon: Qusar

Population
  - Total: 369
- Time zone: UTC+4 (AZT)
  - Summer (DST): UTC+5 (AZT)

Xuluq (also, Khulukh) is a village and municipality in the Qusar Rayon of Azerbaijan. It has a population of 369. The municipality consists of the villages of Xuluq and Gilah.

The village itself is located on the altitude of 1100 meters above sea level. Khulukh is a monoethnic village, all the representers of the village are Lezgins.
