= Nəcəfkənd =

- Municipality
- Location within Azerbaijan
- Coordinates: 41°29′N 48°12′E
- Country: Azerbaijan
- Rayon: Qusar

Population
  - Total: 341
- Time zone: UTC+4 (AZT)
  - Summer (DST): UTC+5 (AZT)

Nəcəfkənd (lezg. Неджефхуьр/Наджефхуьр) is a village and municipality in the Qusar Rayon of Azerbaijan. It has a population of 341. The municipality consists of the villages of Nəcəfkənd and Aşağı Qələnxur.
