= Kuzun =

- Municipality
- Location within Azerbaijan
- Coordinates: 41°20′27″N 48°08′09″E
- Country: Azerbaijan
- Rayon: Qusar

Population
  - Total: 1,091
- Time zone: UTC+4 (AZT)
  - Summer (DST): UTC+5 (AZT)

Kuzun (also, Kiozun and Kyuzun) is a village and municipality in the Qusar Rayon of Azerbaijan. It has a population of 1,091. The municipality consists of the villages of Kuzun, Çətgün, and Laza.
