= Atlıxan =

Coordinates: 41°30′N 48°34′E

Atlıxan is a village and municipality in the Qusar Rayon of Azerbaijan. It has a population of 664.
