= Gədəzeyxur =

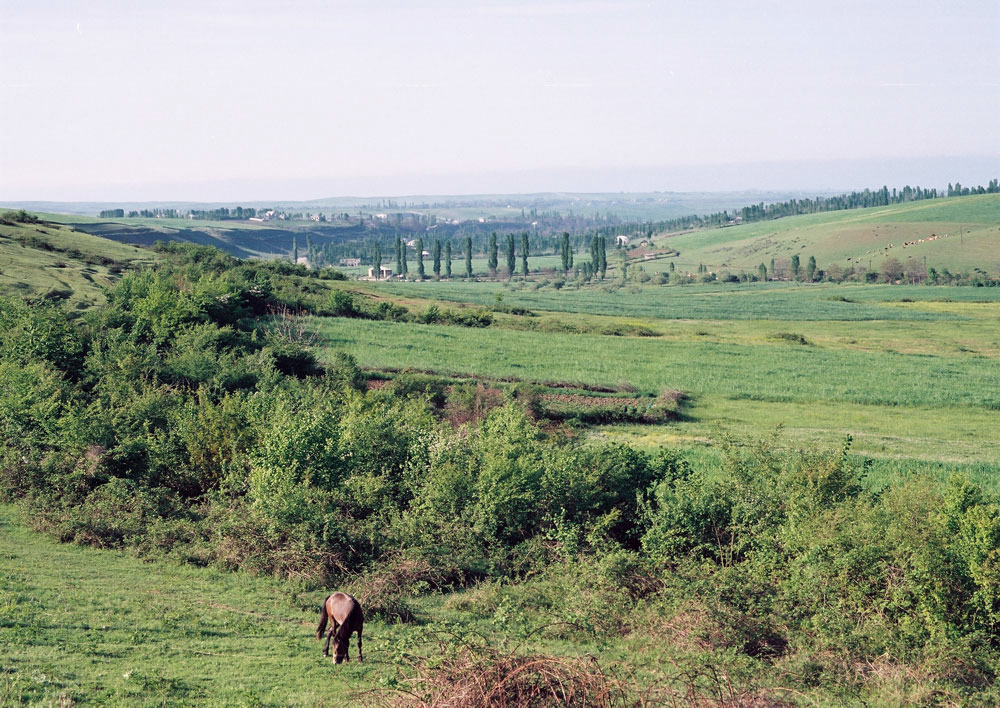
Gədəzeyxur
- Municipality
- Location within Azerbaijan
- Coordinates: 41°29′24″N 48°25′50″E
- Country: Azerbaijan
- Rayon: Qusar

Population
  - Total: 2,225
- Time zone: UTC+4 (AZT)
  - Summer (DST): UTC+5 (AZT)

Gədəzeyxur (also, Gedazeykhur) is a village and municipality in the Qusar Rayon of Azerbaijan. It has a population of 2,225.
