= Yuxarı Zeyxur =

- Municipality
- Location within Azerbaijan
- Coordinates: 41°34′06″N 48°22′59″E
- Country: Azerbaijan
- Rayon: Qusar

Population
  - Total: 861
- Time zone: UTC+4 (AZT)
  - Summer (DST): UTC+5 (AZT)

Yuxarı Zeyxur (also, Yukhari-Zeykhur and Yukhary-Zeykhur) is a village and municipality in the Qusar Rayon of Azerbaijan. It has a population of 861.
