= Bədişqala =

- Municipality
- Location within Azerbaijan
- Coordinates: 41°31′03″N 48°25′42″E
- Country: Azerbaijan
- Rayon: Qusar

Population
  - Total: 1,035
- Time zone: UTC+4 (AZT)
  - Summer (DST): UTC+5 (AZT)

Bədişqala (also, Bedishkala) is a village and municipality in the Qusar Rayon of Azerbaijan. It has a population of 1,035.
