= Gican =

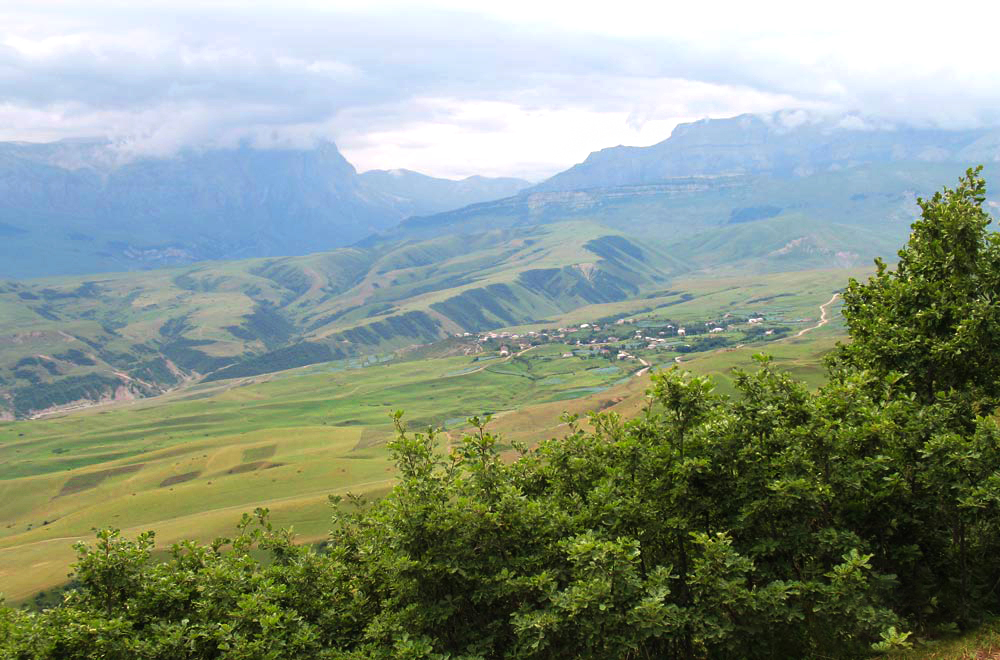
Gican
- Municipality
- Location within Azerbaijan
- Coordinates: 41°23′00″N 48°07′05″E
- Country: Azerbaijan
- Rayon: Qusar

Population
  - Total: 517
- Time zone: UTC+4 (AZT)
  - Summer (DST): UTC+5 (AZT)

Gican (also, Gidzhan) is a village and municipality in the Qusar Rayon of Azerbaijan. It has a population of 517.
