= İmamqulukənd =

- Municipality
- Location within Azerbaijan
- Coordinates: 41°33′26″N 48°26′41″E
- Country: Azerbaijan
- Rayon: Qusar

Population
  - Total: 2,798
- Time zone: UTC+4 (AZT)
  - Summer (DST): UTC+5 (AZT)

İmamqulukənd (also, Imamqulukənd, Imamakulukend, Imamkulikend, Imamkulikend-Kishlak, and Imamkulukend) is a village and municipality in the Qusar Rayon of Azerbaijan. It has a population of 2,798. The municipality consists of the villages of İmamqulukənd and Suduroba.

== See also ==
The village is so named because it was built by a man named İmamqulu in 1899.
