= List of monuments of Azerbaijan =

This is a list of monuments in Azerbaijan.

== A ==
- Ahmadalilar Mausoleum
- Akhsadan Baba Mausoleum
- Alinja Tower
- Ambaras Mosque
- Armenian cemetery in Julfa
- Ateshgah of Baku

== B ==
- Barda Mausoleum
- Basilica in Qum village

== C ==
- Chirag Gala

== D ==
- Diri Baba Mausoleum

== G ==
- Galarsan-Gorarsan
- Garabaghlar Mausoleum
- Garghabazar Caravanserai
- Garghabazar Mosque
- Gilahli Mosque in Shaki
- Guba Memorial Complex
- Gulustan Mausoleum

== H ==
- Haji Gayib’s bathhouse
- Huseyn Javid Monument

== I ==
- Imamzadeh (Ganja)
- Imamzadeh complex in Nakhchivan

== J ==
- Juma Mosque in Ordubad
- Juma Mosque in Sheki
- Juma Mosque of Nakhchivan

== K ==
- Khachin-Turbatli Mausoleum
- Khanegah tomb
- Khojaly Memorial (Baku)
- Kirna mausoleum

== L ==
- Lekh Castle

== M ==
- Maiden Tower (Baku)
- Mammadbayli Mausoleum
- Mausoleum of Huseyn Javid
- Mausoleum of Seyid Yahya Bakuvi
- Mausoleum of Sheikh Juneyd
- Mirali Mausoleum
- Momine Khatun Mausoleum
- Monument to Mirza Alakbar Sabir

== N ==
- Nakhchivan Memorial Museum
- Nardaran Fortress
- Nizami Mausoleum
- Noah’s Mausoleum (Nakhchivan, Azerbaijan)

== P ==
- Papravand Mausoleum
- Parigala

== R ==
- Ramana Tower

== S ==
- Shahbulag Castle
- Shaki Caravanserai
- Sheykh Babi Yagub Mausoleum
- Shirvan Domes

== T ==
- Treasury of Bahman Mirza
- Tuba Shahi Mosque

== V ==
- Vagif Mausoleum

== Y ==
- Yeddi Gumbaz mausoleum
- Yezidabad castle
