= Gubad Gasimov =

Soviet musicologist

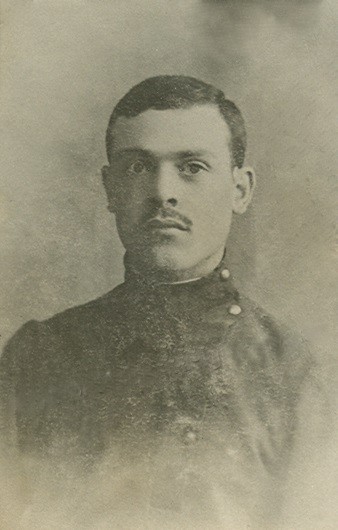
- Born: 1896; Qarğabazar, Jebrail uezd, Elizavetpol Governorate, Caucasus Viceroyalty, Russian Empire
- Died: 1993; Baku, Azerbaijan
- Education: Baku State University
- Occupation: Art history

Gubad Abdulla oglu Gasimov (Azerbaijani: Qubad Abdulla oğlu Qasımov; 1896-1993) was an Azerbaijani and Soviet musicologist, Honored Worker of Culture of the AzSSR (1968), Candidate of Historical Sciences (1949).

== Life ==
Gasimov was born in the village of Kargabazar, Jabrayil district, Elizavetpol province. In 1928, he graduated from the historical department of the oriental studies faculty of Azerbaijan State University. In 1921-1939, he worked as a director of the Azerbaijan Telegraph Agency, head of department and executive secretary of the newspapers Kommunist, Yeni-El, Baku Rabochiy. In 1940-1944 he was a senior researcher at the research cabinet of music at the Baku Academy of Music. In 1945-1950 he was the scientific secretary of the Institute of Azerbaijani Art of the Academy of Sciences of the AzSSR. In 1945-1950 he was the scientific secretary of the Institute of Azerbaijani Art of the Academy of Sciences of the AzSSR. In 1951-1954 he was a lecturer (since 1954 an associate professor), since 1952 he was the head of the department, in 1953-1955 he was dean of the Higher Correspondence Pedagogical Institute. In 1955-1970 he was the head of the department of the history of Azerbaijani music, since 1971 he was a senior researcher at the Azerbaijan State University of Culture and Arts. He died in 1993.
