= Ahmadalilar Mausoleum =

13th century burial place in Azerbaijan

- Arğalı türbəsi
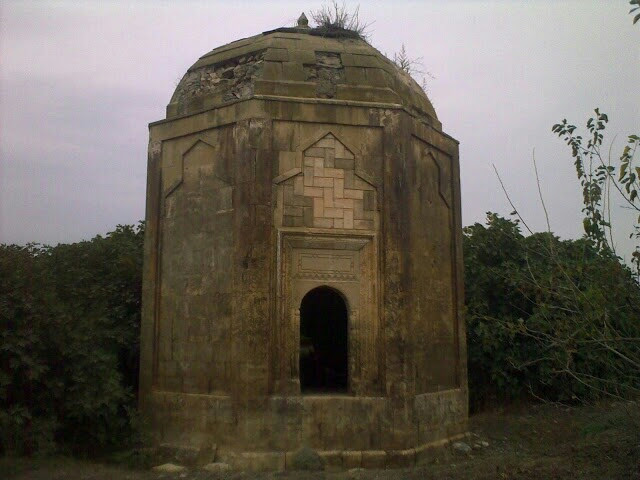
- Interactive map of Ahmadalilar Mausoleum
- Location: Fuzuli Rayon, Azerbaijan
- Coordinates: 39°25′23″N 47°20′05″E
- Type: Mausoleum
- Completion date: 13th century

Ahmadalilar Mausoleum (Azerbaijani: Arğalı türbəsi) is a mausoleum in the Əhmədalılar village of Fuzuli Rayon, Azerbaijan. It was built in the 13th century.

The tomb was included in the list of local significant immovable historical and cultural monuments by the decision No. 132 of the Cabinet of Ministers of the Republic of Azerbaijan on August 2, 2001.

== About ==
The Arghali Tomb was built in the 13th century near the village of Ahmadalilar in the Fuzuli district. It is named after the former village of Arghali, which was located near the tomb. However, the identity of the person buried in the tomb, the century they lived in, and the specific reason for the construction of the tomb at this location have not been investigated.

After Azerbaijan regained its independence, the tomb was included in the list of local significant immovable historical and cultural monuments by decision No. 132 of the Cabinet of Ministers of the Republic of Azerbaijan on August 2, 2001.

== Architecture ==
The Arghali Tomb is constructed on a flat terrain. Architecturally, it has an octagonal plan, which means both its body and dome have eight sides. The mausoleum is octahedral and covered with a cloistered vault. It is identical to Sheykh Babi Yagub Mausoleum located not far away. It is a part of a group of octahedral mausoleums including Shaykh Babi Yagub Mausoleum in Fuzuli Rayon, Seyid Yahya Bakuvi Mausoleum in Baku, a mausoleum in Hazra village of Qusar Rayon and others. Despite this, the dome of the Arghali Tomb is constructed as a two-story structure, with a layer of stone and a layer of clay and straw mixture filling the space in between. Instead of a mihrab (prayer niche), a second door is placed opposite the door on the northern side of the tomb. Both door frames are adorned with intricate geometric designs. There are no inscriptions found on the Arghali Tomb, which is why it takes its name from the village it is located in. Some researchers, based on the architectural and construction style of the tomb, attribute its construction to the 13th century.

== See also ==
- Fuzuli District
- Əhmədalılar
