= Garghabazar Mosque =

Former mosque in Qarğabazar, Fuzuli, Azerbaijan

- Azerbaijani: Qarğabazar Məscidi
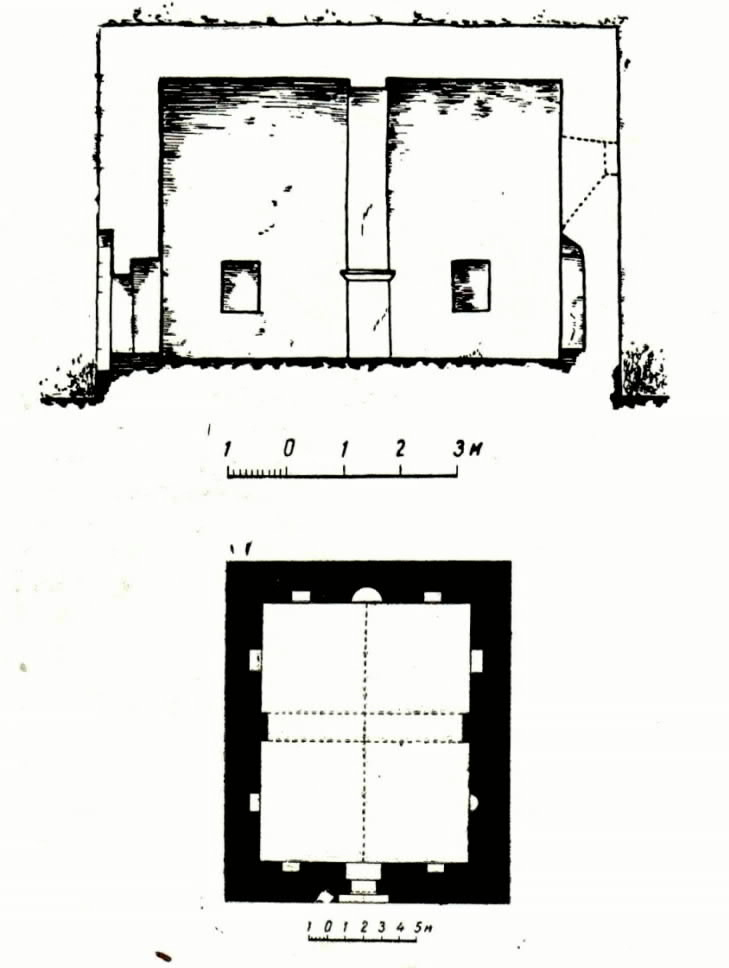
- Floor plan of the former mosque

- Location of the former mosque in Azerbaijan

Religion
- Affiliation: Islam (former)
- Ecclesiastical or organizational status: Mosque

Location
- Location: Garghabazar, Fuzuli District
- Country: Azerbaijan
- Interactive map of Garghabazar Mosque
- Coordinates: 39°32′20″N 47°09′26″E

Architecture
- Completed: 1095 AH (1683/1684 CE)
- Materials: Stone

The Garghabazar Mosque (Azerbaijani: Qarğabazar məscidi), also known as the Giyas ad-Din Mosque, is a former mosque, located in Garghabazar village, of the Fuzuli District, in Azerbaijan.

== History ==
There is a ligature on the entrance door of the mosque that, translated into English, reads:

“This mosque is built by Haji Giyas ad-Din a honest creature of Great Allah, in 1095 AH (1683/1684 CE).”

The Haji Giyas ad-Din mosque has not any balcony and has only one hall built of local construction materials such as stone. A roof of the mosque is arch-shaped. There was not used any wood except in entrance door. The mosque was built on a rocky hill located in the center of the village. The Garghabazar Caravanserai, built in the same year, is located in the southern part of the village.

According to an architectural analysis of the caravanserai and the mosque, both of them were built by the same architect.

== See also ==
- Islam in Azerbaijan
- List of mosques in Azerbaijan
