= Sheykh Babi Yagub Mausoleum =

Mausoleum in the Fuzuli District of Azerbaijan

Coordinates: 39.409821°N 47.327278°E

- Şeyx Babı türbəsi
- Interactive map of Sheykh Babi Yagub Mausoleum
- Location: Fuzuli District, Azerbaijan
- Type: Mausoleum
- Completion date: 1272

Sheykh Babi Yagub Mausoleum (Azerbaijani: Şeyx Babı türbəsi) is a mausoleum in Babi village in the Fuzuli District of the disputed Karabakh region internationally recognized as a part of Azerbaijan. The mausoleum was built in 1272. It was heavily damaged by the Armenian Armed Forces on 29 September 2020, during the clashes with Azerbaijan.

== Investigations ==
A.I.Brozgul wrongly dated a complex to the 12th century, and I.P.Sheblykin mistakenly called the mausoleum “Shah Babali”. A kufi ligature on the mausoleum drew N.V.Khanikov's attention in the middle of the 19th century, and he called the village “Babili” in his work and “Bab” in an album. But the ligature was written by Khanikov with mistakes and omissions. Later this ligature was fully decoded and included in the volume of a publication of Arabic-Persian-Azerbaijani language inscriptions of Azerbaijan.

In the summer of 2011, archaeological excavations of the mausoleum began by the order of the Ministry of Culture and Tourism of Azerbaijan. Khagani Almammadov - leader of the expedition informed that ruins of Sheykh Babi khanegah were also found near the mausoleum, which had been initially used as a caravanserai and afterwards it was used as a mosque. According to his words, there were found 6 stone graves, which belonged supposedly to warriors. In one of the graves was a headless skeleton, in the other – a skeleton and arrowheads. It is planned to carry out restoration works at the completion of the excavations.

== Architecture ==
The mausoleum is octahedral and the widths of the edges are 3 meters. The mausoleum is covered with an octahedral spherical cupola made of thin stone plates. Material is drafted stone (limestone).

== Gallery ==
Sheykh Babi Yagub Mausoleum

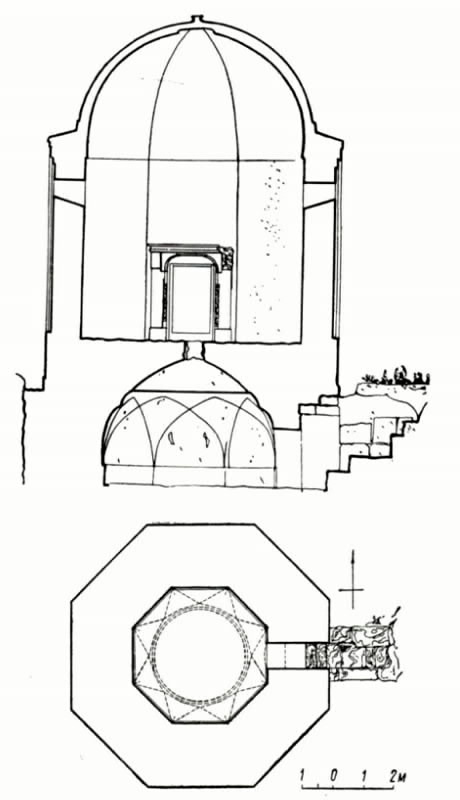

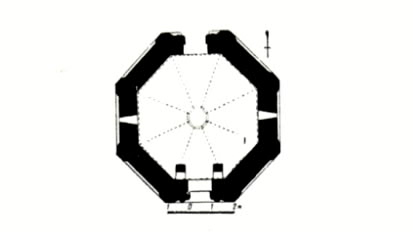

== See also ==
- Ahmadalilar Mausoleum
- Mausoleum of Seyid Yahya Bakuvi

== Literature ==
- Брозгуль А. И. Мавзолей в селе Бабы. — М.: ПАЭН, 1947.
