= Ambaras Mosque =

Mosque in Ordubad, Azerbaijan

- Ambaras məscidi
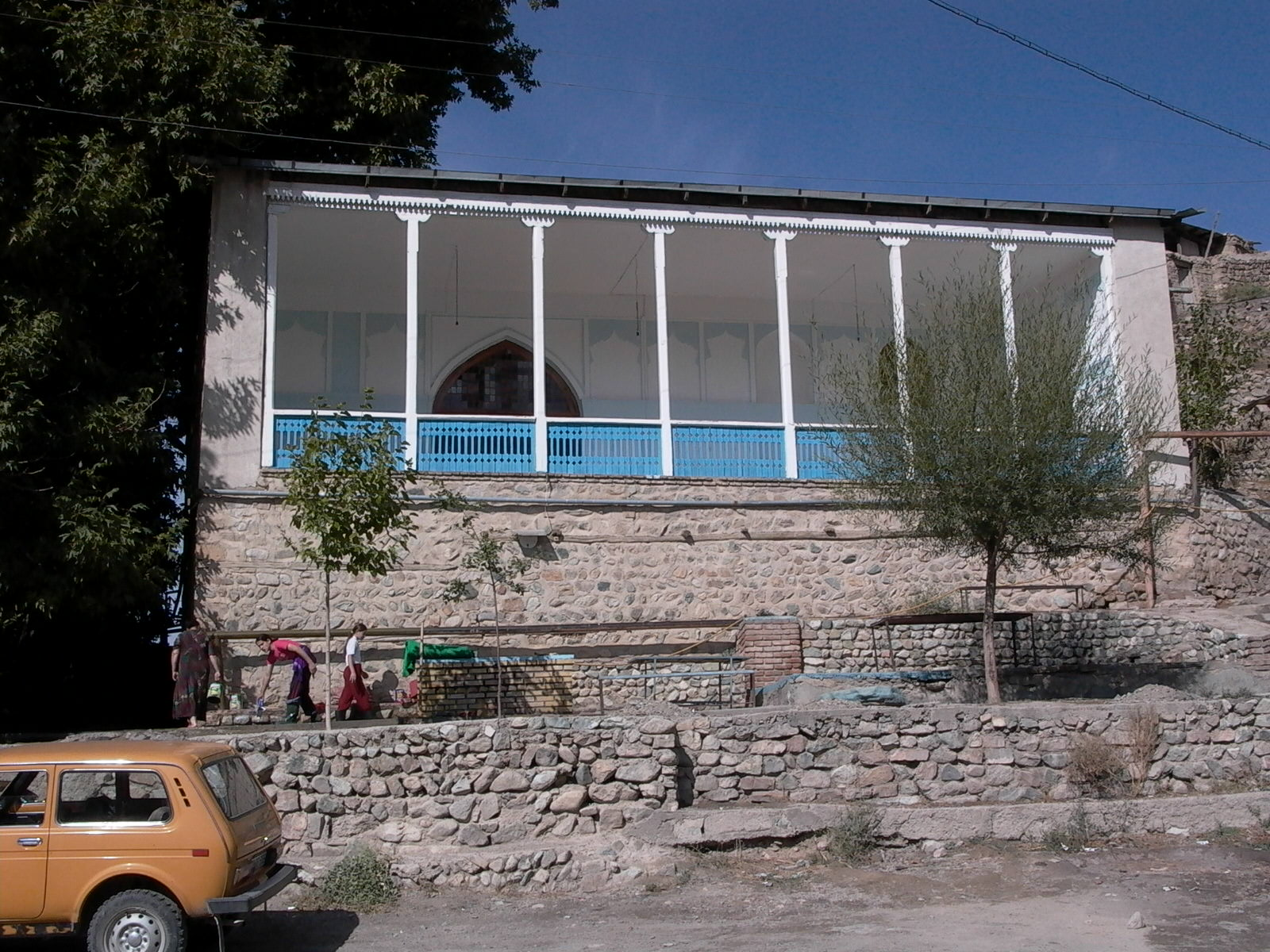

- Location of the mosque in Azerbaijan

Religion
- Affiliation: Sunni Islam
- Ecclesiastical or organisational status: Mosque
- Status: Active

Location
- Location: Ordubad
- Country: Azerbaijan
- Interactive map of Ambaras Mosque
- Coordinates: 38°54′50″N 46°01′11″E

Architecture
- Type: Islamic architecture
- Style: Nakhchivan-Maragha School
- Completed: 17th-century
- Materials: Iron; stone; bricks

The Ambaras Mosque (Azerbaijani: Ambaras məscidi), also known as the Mir Jafar Agha Mosque (Azerbaijani: Mir Cəfər Ağa məscidi) or the Yukhari Ambaras Mosque (Azerbaijani: Yuxarı Ambaras məscidi), is a 17th-century Sunni mosque and architectural monument located in the city of Ordubad, Azerbaijan.

The mosque was included in the list of immovable historical and cultural monuments of local importance by the decision No. 132 of the Cabinet of Azerbaijan dated August 2, 2001. Later, by decision No. 98 of the Cabinet of Ministers of the Nakhchivan Autonomous Republic dated November 21, 2007, Ambaras Mosque was classified as an architectural monument of national importance. It is situated within the territory of the “Ordubad” State Historical and Cultural Reserve.

== About ==
The Yukhari Ambaras Mosque is located in the Ambaras neighborhood of the city of Ordubad. The exact date of the mosque's construction is unknown. During renovation works in the 19th century, an inscription written in black ink on wood was placed on the ceiling of the mosque.

According to the inscription, it is understood that in the 19th century the mosque was referred to as the "Agha Mirza Jafar Mosque." The spatial layout and the architectural composition techniques used in the construction of the facade indicate that the mosque was built in the 17th–18th centuries. It is presumed that the mosque was originally built in the 17th century by a person named Agha Mirza Jafar. For this reason, the mosque is also known as the "Agha Mirza Jafar" or "Mir Jafar Agha" Mosque.

The mosque, attributed to the Nakhchivan-Maragha school of architecture, has a rectangular shape. Its facade is constructed with iron and brick, while the interior is built using stone and brick. The ceiling is supported by six columns. The windows and doors feature "shabaka" (latticework). The second floor is designated for women’s worship.

=== During Soviet Occupaiton ===
After the Soviet occupation of Azerbaijan, an official campaign against religion began in 1928. In December of that year, the Central Committee of the Communist Party of Azerbaijan transferred many mosques, churches, and synagogues to the management of cultural clubs for educational purposes. While there were 3,000 mosques in Azerbaijan in 1917, this number dropped to 1,700 in 1927, to 1,369 in 1928, and to just 17 by 1933. The Yukhari Ambaras Mosque also ceased functioning during this period.

=== After İndependence ===
After Azerbaijan regained its independence, the mosque was included in the list of immovable historical and cultural monuments of local importance by Decision No. 132 of the Cabinet of Azerbaijan dated August 2, 2001. Later, by Decision No. 98 of the Cabinet of Ministers of the Nakhchivan Autonomous Republic dated November 21, 2007, the Ambaras Mosque was granted the status of a monument of national importance.

In 2024, the "Ordubad" State Historical and Cultural Reserve was established in this area. Over 200 of the 299 monuments located in the Ordubad district — including the Yukhari Ambaras Mosque — are situated within the territory of the reserve.

== See also ==
- Islam in Azerbaijan
- List of mosques in Azerbaijan
- List of monuments of Azerbaijan
