= Keygubad Mosque =

Historical mosque of the 14th century in Azerbaijan

- Azerbaijani: Kеyqubаd Məscidi; Persian: مسجد کیقباد
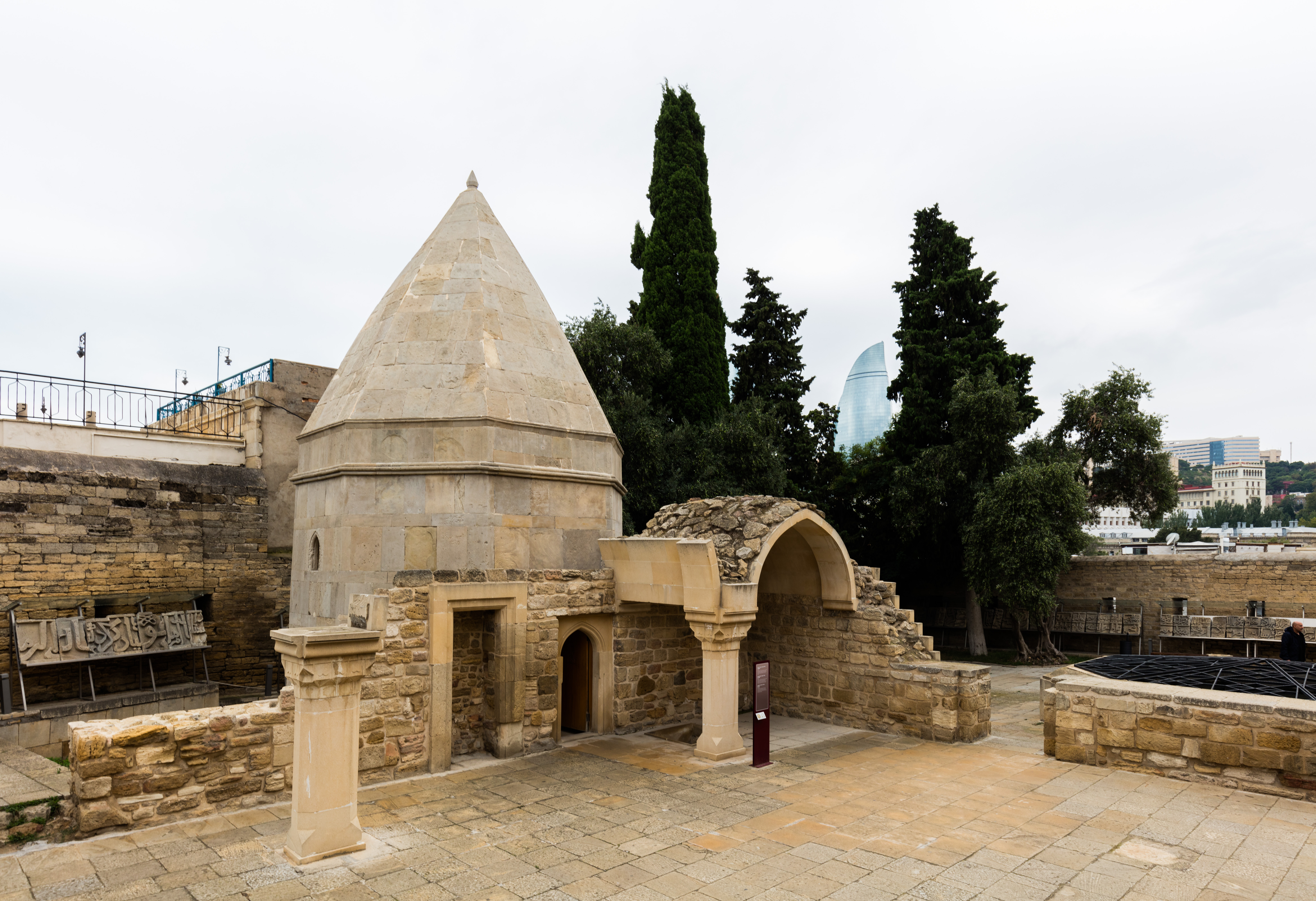
- Partial ruins of the former mosque in 2008, with the intact conical-domed mausoleum

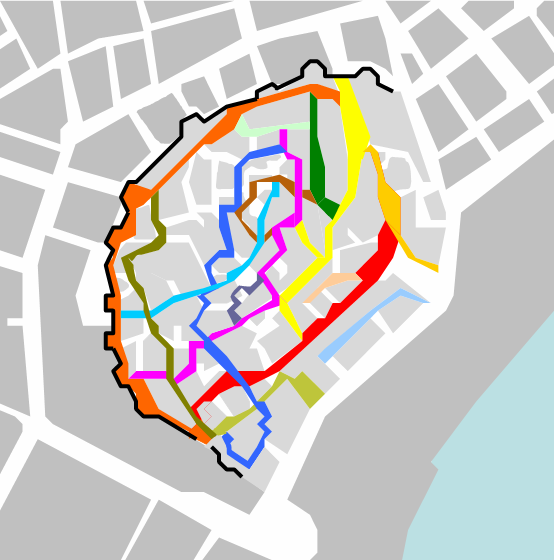
- Location of the former mosque in the Baku Old City

Religion
- Affiliation: Islam (former)
- Ecclesiastical or organizational status: Mosque (14th century–1918)
- Status: Abandoned (partial ruins)

Location
- Location: Old City, Baku
- Country: Azerbaijan
- Interactive map of Keygubad Mosque
- Coordinates: 40°21′58″N 49°50′00″E

Architecture
- Type: Mosque architecture
- Style: Islamic; Shirvan-Absheron
- Founder: Keyqubad I
- Completed: 14th century

UNESCO World Heritage Site
- Official name: Keygubad Mosque
- Type: Cultural
- Criteria: iv
- Designated: 2000 (24th session)
- Part of: Walled City of Baku with the Shirvanshah's Palace and Maiden Tower
- Reference no.: 958
- Region: Europe/Asia
- Endangered: 2003–2009

The Keygubad Mosque (Azerbaijani: Kеyqubаd Məscidi; Persian: مسجد کیقباد) is a historical former mosque, now in partial ruins, located on Gala turn in the Old City of Baku in Azerbaijan. The 14th century former mosque is on the south side of the mausoleum of Seyid Yahya Bakuvi.

The Keygubad Mosque forms part of the UNESCO World Heritage-listed Palace of the Shirvanshahs.

== History ==
The precise history and function of the building is controversial. Historically, Keygubad mosque was a building of mosque-madrasa which was adjacent to Darvish tomb. Abbasgulu Bakikhanov wrote about Bakuvi on his teaching and worshipping in the mosque:

“His prayer room, his school and his grave is in there – in the mosque.”

Shirvanshah Keyqubad I was in power in 1317–48. According to prominent researcher, S. Ashurbeyli, Keyqubad was grandfather of Sheikh Ibrahim.

During 1918 events the mosque was burnt by Armenian troops.

In the southern part of the lower courtyard of the Shirvanshahs Palace, only the remains of the foundation and a few arches of Keygubad mosque are left.

== Architectural features ==
The mosque consists of a rectangle worshipping hall and a corridor in front of it. Originally on the center of the hall, there used to be 4 columns to hold the dome. A portal was adjacent to the hall along with vestibule. On the southern wall of the hall there used to be a mihrab.

Together with the mausoleum and the Keygubad Mosque, the middle courtyard occupies a neutral position in the Shirvanshahs' palace complex due to its location.

== Gallery ==
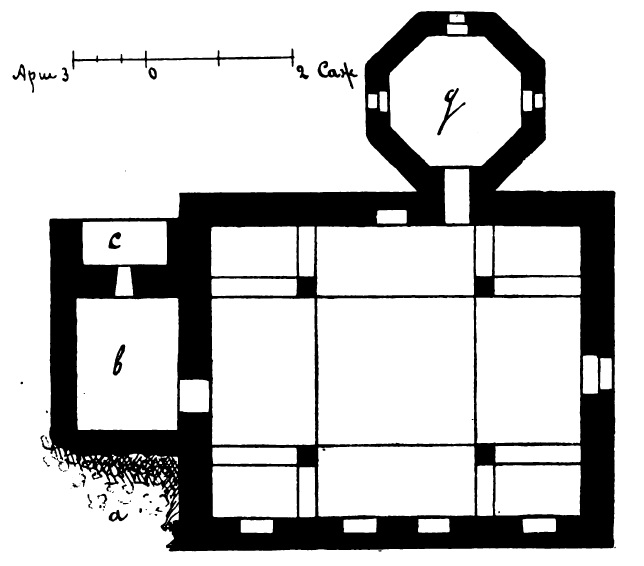
Floor plan

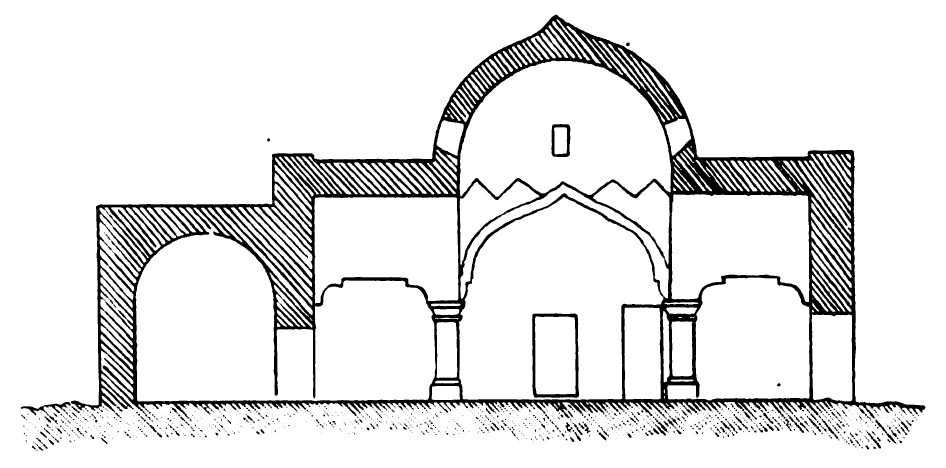
Cross section

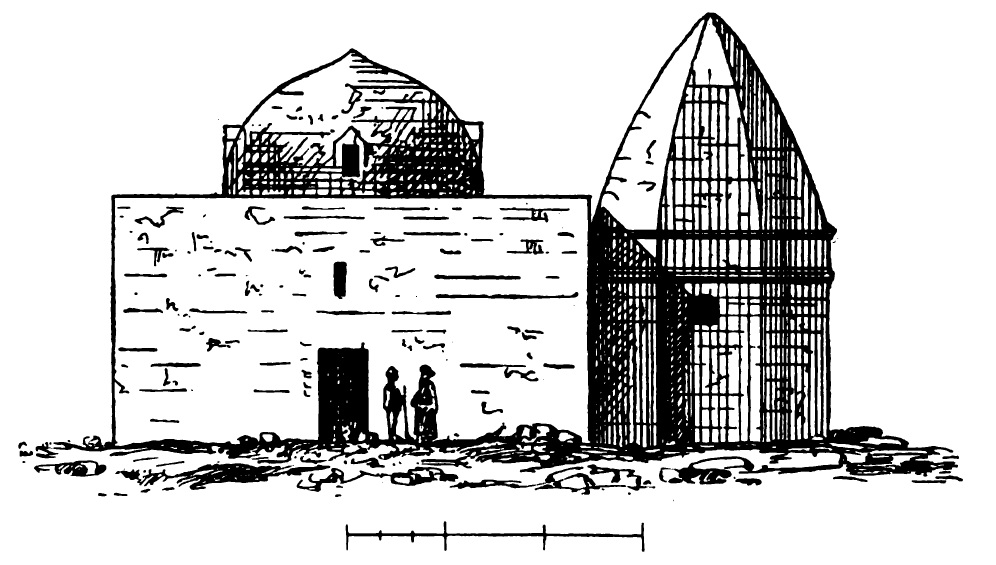
Side view

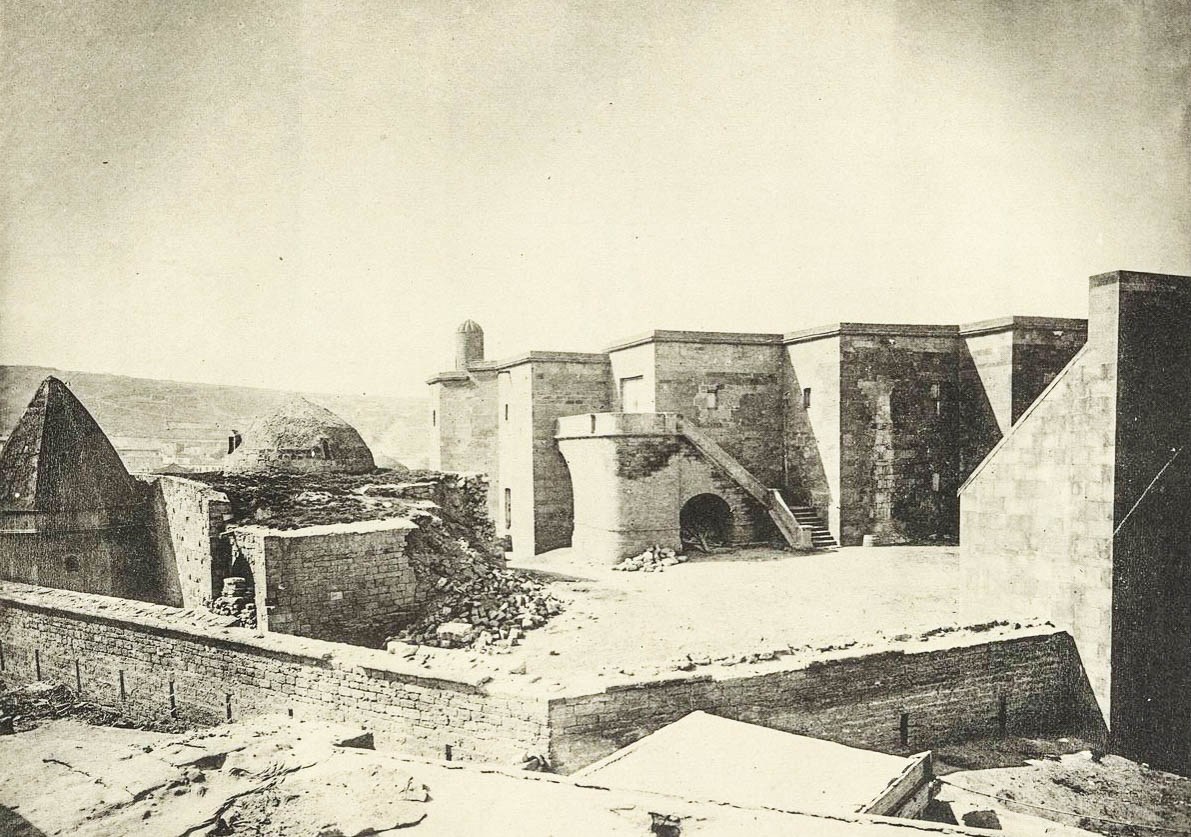
View of the mosque before its destruction

== See also ==
- Islam in Azerbaijan
- List of mosques in Azerbaijan
