= Huseyn Javid Monument =

Sculpture by Omar Eldarov

- Azerbaijani: Hüseyn Cavidin heykəli
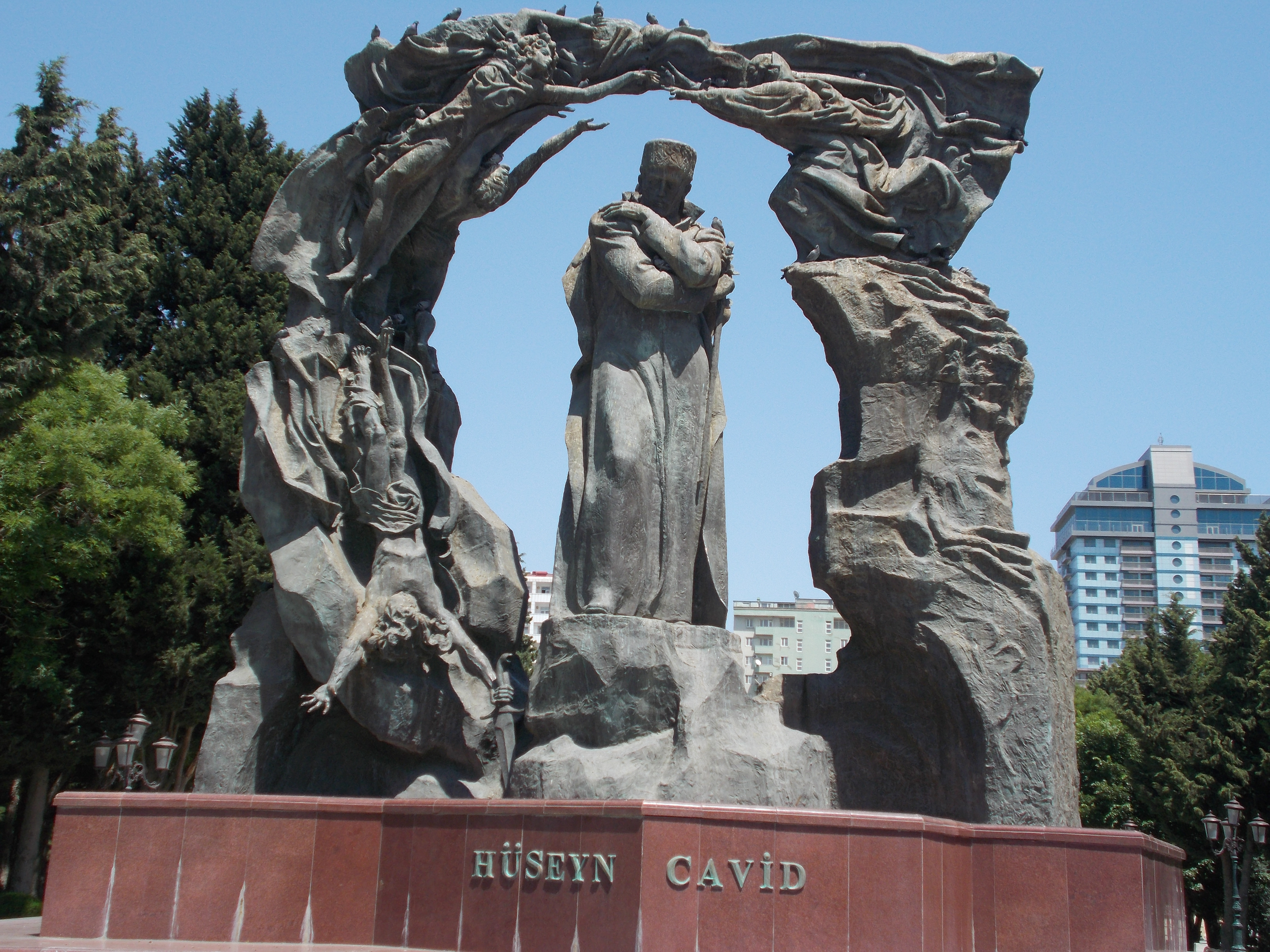
- Huseyn Javid Monument in Baku (May 2020)
- Location: Baku, Azerbaijan
- Coordinates: 40°22′25″N 49°49′01″E
- Designer: Omar Eldarov
- Type: Memorial
- Material: bronze
- Length: 5.5 m
- Opening date: May 27, 1993
- Dedicated to: Huseyn Javid

Huseyn Javid Monument (Azerbaijani: Hüseyn Cavidin heykəli) is a monument to the Azerbaijani poet Huseyn Javid, located in Baku, the capital of Azerbaijan, in a park named in his honour, located on the Huseyn Javid Avenue. The authors of the bronze-cast monument are the People's Artist of Azerbaijan, the sculptor Omar Eldarov and the architects Yusif Gadimov and Rasim Aliyev. It was installed in 1993.

== History of creation and inauguration ==
The creation of the monument turned out to be fraught with great difficulties. The work began in the Soviet Azerbaijan, and ended after the collapse of the USSR, in the independent Azerbaijan Republic. The creation of a monumental bronze memorial was an expensive undertaking. At first, there were no problems with the allocation of funds, but with the collapse of the USSR, funding for the construction of the monument was suspended. Only after Azerbaijan gained the independence, and despite the flared-up Armenian-Azerbaijani conflict, the work on the monument was possible to be completed.

Omar Eldarov recalls that the idea of creating a monument to Huseyn Javid belonged to Heydar Aliyev. The work on the monument, and then on the high relief, required the sculptor to study the life and work of Huseyn Javid. But according to the artistic plan of Eldarov, it was necessary to perpetuate the memory of not only Huseyn Javid, but also many other Azerbaijanis who became victims of the political repression in the first half of the 20th century. Thus, Omar Eldarov, when creating the monument to Hussein Javid, embodied the idea of the life cycle of a whole generation of people.

The grand opening of the memorial complex in Baku took place on 27 May 1993. Turan Javid, the daughter of Huseyn Javid, spoke at the ceremony. She recalled:

I will forever remember that terrible day on 4 June 1937, when my father was arrested. And now, in the days of our people celebrating, already in freedom, the anniversary of Azerbaijans independence, a monument will be raised to my father, who gave his life for this freedom...

The meeting dedicated to the monument's inauguration ended with the first performance of the "March of the Patriots" that day, written by the poets son Ertogrul Javid.

== See also ==
- Khojaly Massacre Memorial
- Mustafa Kemal Atatürk Monument, Baku
- Wolfgang Amadeus Mozart monument, Baku
