= Mirali Mausoleum =

Mausoleum in the Fuzuli District of Azerbaijan

- Mirəli türbəsi
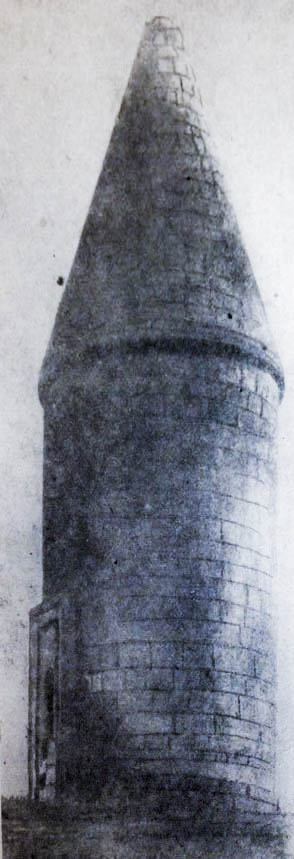
- Mirali Mausoleum.
- Interactive map of Mirali Mausoleum
- Location: Aşağı Veysəlli, Fuzuli District, Azerbaijan
- Coordinates: 39°41′50″N 47°11′53″E
- Type: Mausoleum
- Beginning date: 14th century

Mirali mausoleum (Azerbaijani: Mirəli türbəsi) is a historical and architectural monument located near the necropolis dating back to the Middle Ages between the Kurdlar and Ashaghi Veysalli villages in the Fuzuli district. There is no information about whom the monument is dedicated to, who the architect and commissioner are, and the exact construction date. The monument was included in the list of nationally significant immovable historical and cultural monuments by the decision of the Cabinet of Azerbaijan on August 2, 2001, with the number 132.

Mirali Tomb is covered with stone slabs and has a cylindrical shape. Over time, the surface of the cylinder has taken on a beautiful golden tone, covered with strong stones. Stones were also used in the construction of the tomb, and the wall is built in neat rows.

== History ==
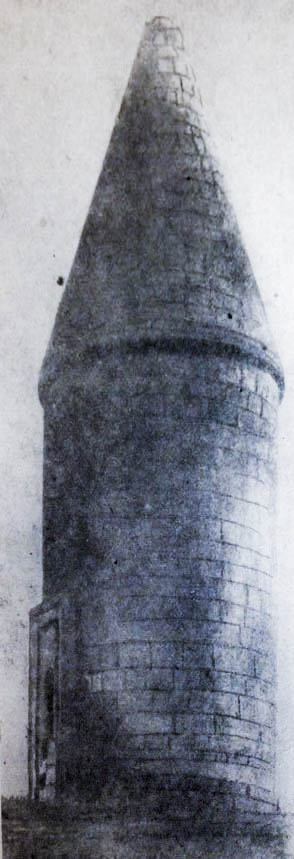
Mirali Mausoleum in the early 1940s.İvan Şeblıkin in "A black-and-white photo published in the book "Architectural Monuments of the Nizami Period of Azerbaijan"(1943).

There is no inscription on either the underground or above-ground parts of the tomb indicating its history, architect, or dedication. Ivan Sheblykin notes that "the architectural form, sensitivity in the choice of materials, and the characteristics of the polished stone used in construction suggest that the structure was built no later than the XIII–XIV centuries."

The tomb shares similarities with the Shikh Baba Tomb located in the village of Shikhlar in the Jabrayil district in terms of architectural features.

Sheblykin, who researched the monument, recorded the legend about the construction of the tomb from the locals in the Kurdlar village of Fuzuli:

In the plain of Mil-Mugan, a renowned master, along with his apprentice, is engaged in the construction of the Prophet's tomb. At that time, they request the apprentice to build a tomb near the Veysalli village. Without obtaining the approval of his master, the apprentice takes on the task. After completing the work on the Prophet's tomb during the day, the young apprentice starts working on the Mir Ali tomb at night, implementing the construction throughout the night. During the day, he returns to assist in the construction of the Prophet's tomb alongside his master. After a while, the construction of the Mir Ali tomb finally comes to an end. News about the magnificent new dome spreads far and wide, reaching the ears of the master craftsman. The master sets out to see the new building. Upon arriving at the location, he stands quietly for a long time, observing the beautiful work. Assessing the character and style of the work, as well as other distinctive features, the master understands who the architect of the monument is. Dark jealousy and anger find their way into the master's mind and heart, leading him to cut off the hands of the apprentice.

Sheblykin mentions that this legend is widely spread in the region and has been reflected in various sources, associated with different monuments in different periods and through different narratives. For example, the construction legend of the Svetitskhoveli Cathedral in the city of Mtskheta also reflects the cutting of the hands of the architect. In Nizami Ganjavi's poem "Seven Beauties," the talented architect Simnar, who built a magnificent building, is thrown from it and killed. The architect of the Sheki Khan's Palace is also blinded after completing the construction.

== Location ==
The monument is marked on old topographic maps under the name "Argali-gumbaz."

The tomb is constructed on the top of a high peak nestled among the foothills, and it appears prominently from a distance, as if seamlessly blending with the natural extension of the summit. Especially during sunset, the tomb, built from white stones, seems to shimmer, capturing attention against the dark background of the mountains. On sunny days, the tomb's distinct silhouette contrasts with the blue sky.

The original form of the monument, the sharpness of its lines, beautiful silhouette, proportional parts, and the refinement of details attract attention at first glance. In the expansive area at the top of the hill where the tomb is constructed, there is a broad cemetery. The hill where the tomb and cemetery are located is situated between the Kurdlar and Ashaghi Veysalli villages in Fuzuli.

== Architectural features ==
=== Aboveground part ===
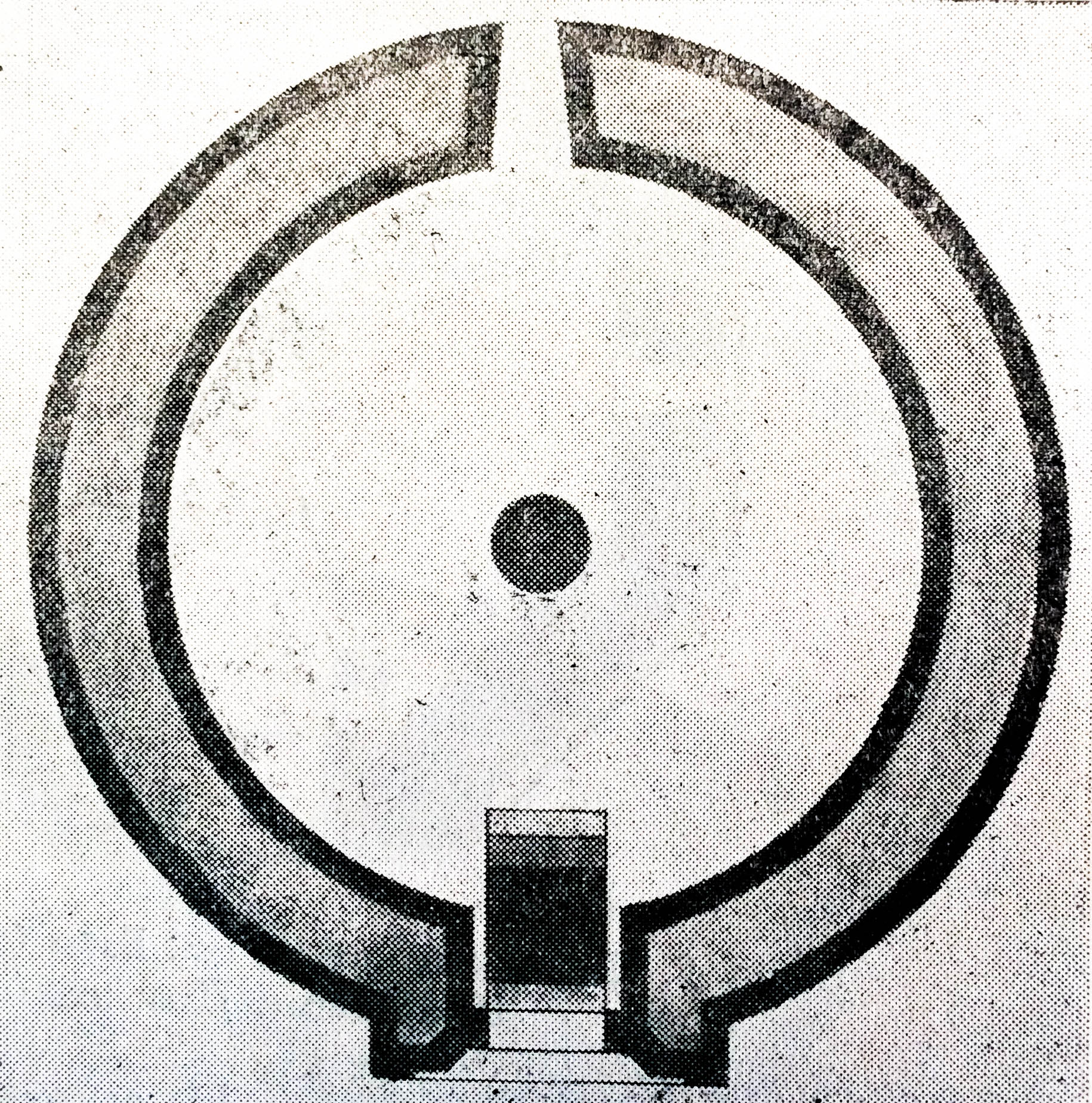
The above-ground part of Mirali tomb The foundation plan drawn by A. Salamzade

The Mirali Tomb has a cylindrical shape covered with stone slabs, and over time, the surface of the cylinder has acquired a beautiful golden tone due to the use of strong stones. The facing stones have undergone a high level of stone-cutting processes, and special attention has been paid to aligning the stones, making the joints virtually invisible.

The perimeter of the tomb's body measures 15 meters and 75 centimeters, and the thickness of the walls of the above-ground part is equal to 80 centimeters. The body of the tomb rises on a stone foundation consisting of three layers of courses; the projection of the lower course of the body relative to the tomb's body is 30 centimeters. The overall height of the building is 45 centimeters.

The body of the tomb is characterized by a regular horizontal arrangement, and the heights of the stone courses vary: 34, 38, 44, 41, 37 centimeters, etc. Only one course of stones, which is the same height as the entrance door, has a height of 14 centimeters. In total, there are twenty-two courses of stones in the body of the tomb, forming a cornice-like structure.

The volume of the cylinder is completed with cornices slightly projecting beyond the general body of the tomb in the upper part. Above the cornice, the dome of the tomb is situated. Nevertheless, without an immediate transition to the dome line, the cornice and the conical dome continue as a delicate line, ensuring the emphasis on the cornice when viewed from a distance. This elegant design solution highlights the tomb's sophisticated and delicate architecture, expressed through simple and laconic forms.

On the north side of the above-ground part of the tomb, the constructed door opening has non-standard dimensions: 55 cm x 155 cm. The entrance is completed with an arch-like stone from the top; the upper part of the arch is created with a whole stone, repeating the same forms from the inside. The entrance part is surrounded by a frame with a quite intricate ornament system, and the entire composition features a portal extending 30 cm beyond the volume of the tomb.

The width of the portal is 175 cm, and its height is 395 cm. The doorstep is located at a height of 115 cm from the existing ground surface. There is no threshold for entry into the above-ground part of the tomb, and I.P. Sheblykin reports that there is no mention of any threshold being present in the initial records.

On the south side of the tomb, directly in front of the main entrance on the central axis, there is a narrow external window place that widens as you go inside. The window place starts from the tenth course of stones externally and covers the entire eleventh course. Internally, the window begins from a height of 297 cm from the floor and spans two courses of stones. The area in front of the window has the traditional sloping form typical for such tall windows, designed to allow as much light as possible to enter.

The external walls of the tomb are adorned with various carvings, including figures of horses, goats, camels, dots, and lines, human figures, depictions of children, dolls, and birds, all created from stone carving techniques and covering approximately the height of an average person. Ivan Sheblykin suggests that these carvings are related to ancient religious beliefs.

=== The dome ===
Stone was also used in the construction of the dome of the tomb, and the courses were laid in even rows. The orientation of the stones was executed so precisely and accurately that, to this day, there is no leakage from the ceiling. Based on observations in 1933, researcher I.P. Sheblykin notes that there is no evidence of any leakage or dampness in the walls and dome of the tomb.

As for the upper part of the conical dome, it is not precisely known how it was originally completed as it had deteriorated. Later, during the Soviet era, the complementary upper part of the tomb was restored in a shape corresponding to the subject. The stones used in the construction of the dome have taken on a pinkish-orange tone over time, with some sections acquiring a bluish-green hue, and sometimes a yellowish tint.

=== Underground part ===
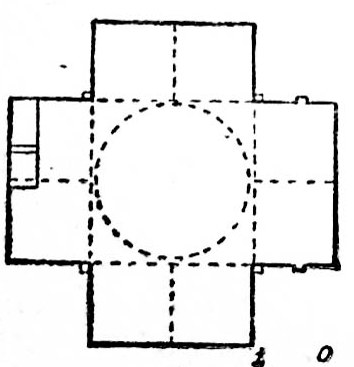
The foundation plan of the underground chamber of the Mirali tomb

The underground part of the Mirali Tomb is internally shaped as a regular circle with a diameter of 375 cm. Large-volume stones were used in the construction of the underground chamber, and the quality of carving in these stones is much weaker than in the stones used in the construction of the above-ground part of the tomb. The courses are laid in even horizontal lines. On the south side of the wall, just below the window, a subtle bulging frame is observed, which is difficult to see. The upper part of the frame is completed with an arch. Over time, the inside of the frame has eroded and is filled with indistinct and unreadable, bulging drawings. Starting from the second course of stones above the window, the wall transitions to a stone due to the inclination of the courses forward. The floor, with a bulge in the center, reflects the curvature of the conical ceiling. In the center of the floor, there is a cavity with a diameter of 50 cm, surrounded by stones, all polished to a shiny black color.

The entrance to the underground chamber is arranged in a rectangular shape resembling a niche, located at the side of the entrance gate of the tomb. The upper part of this rectangular shape measures 98x55 cm. This narrowing is achieved through two stone lintels in the upper part of the dome. Additionally, four additional lintels leading downwards have been built into the wall of the tomb. Only two of these lintels have survived to our time, and the sockets of the other two lintels are preserved in the wall. The height from the upper part of the opening to the floor of the underground chamber is consistent at 3 meters. Each lintel has a different height: 38, 35, 29, 30, and 29 cm. The edges of the lintels, the entrance opening to the underground chamber, and the surrounding stones of the courses have been polished over the years by the feet of visitors to the monument.

The underground part of the tomb has a plan in the shape of a regular cross with arms covered by arch-like stone ceilings, measuring 446x449 cm. Each arm of the cross is covered with arch-like stone ceilings. The height of the ceilings from the ground is 186 cm, and the span of the arch crossing along the floor is 225 cm. The central part of the cross is covered by a conical dome. The height of the central part, which rises to the upper part of the conical dome, from the floor of the underground chamber is 327 cm. The construction of walls, arches, and the dome involves carefully polished large stones. The selection of stones is notable, as stones of various heights were used: 25, 34, 33, 32, 29, and 40 cm.

The floor of the underground chamber is covered with well-carved, light-colored open limestone slabs. In the middle of the floor, there is a small vertical plate with no inscription, believed by researchers to indicate the burial place of the person in the tomb.

Mirali Mausoleum

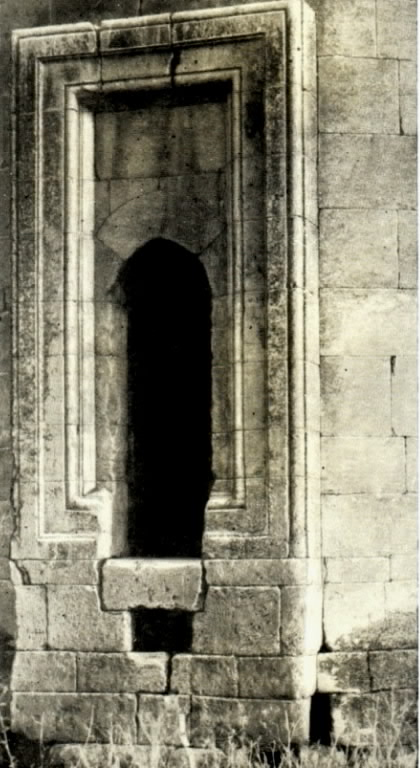
Entrance of the mausoleum
