= Shirvan Domes =

15th-century mausoleum and graveyard in Shamakhi, Azerbaijan

Coordinates: 40°37′13.49″N 48°38′8.19″E

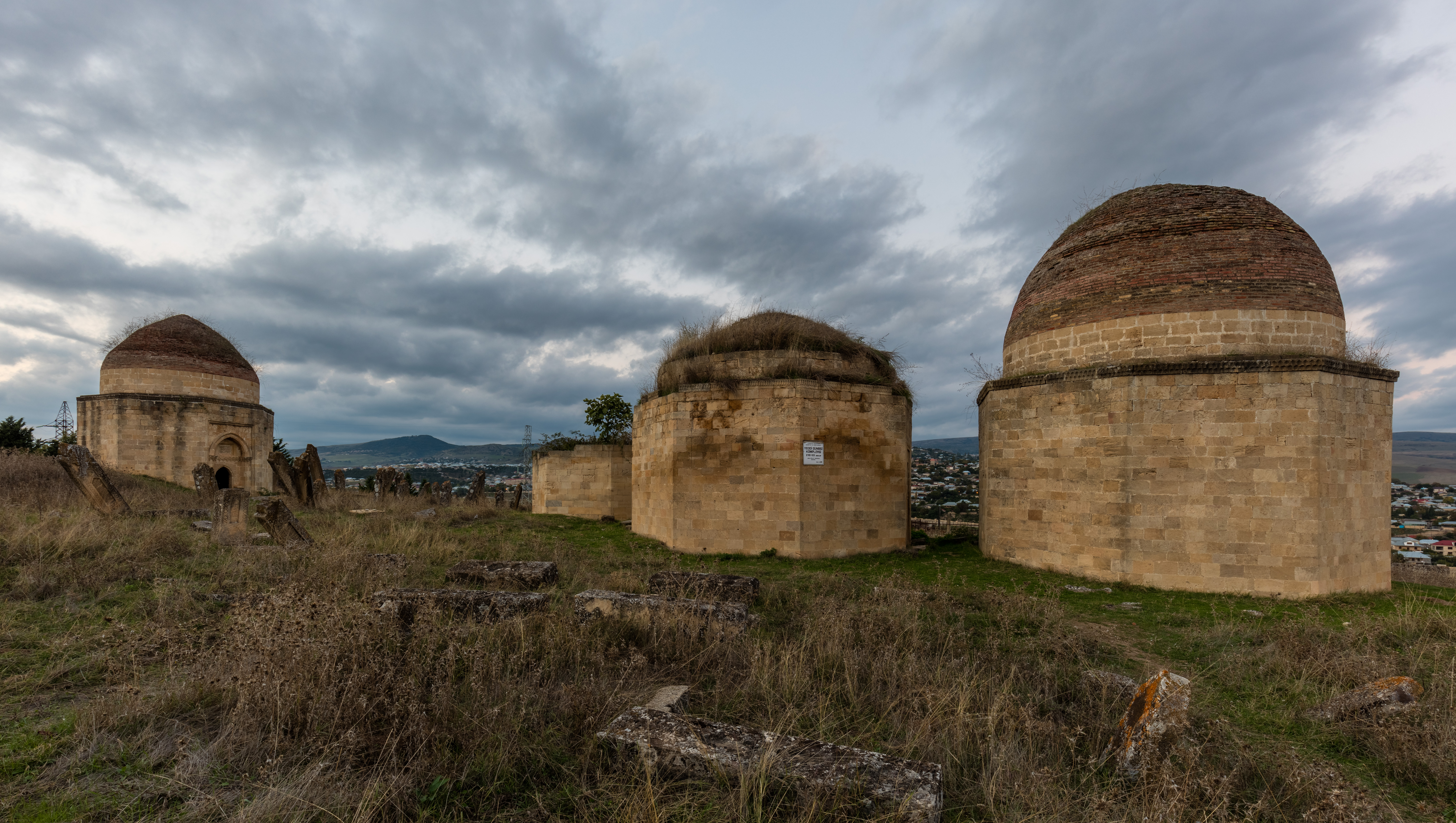
General view.

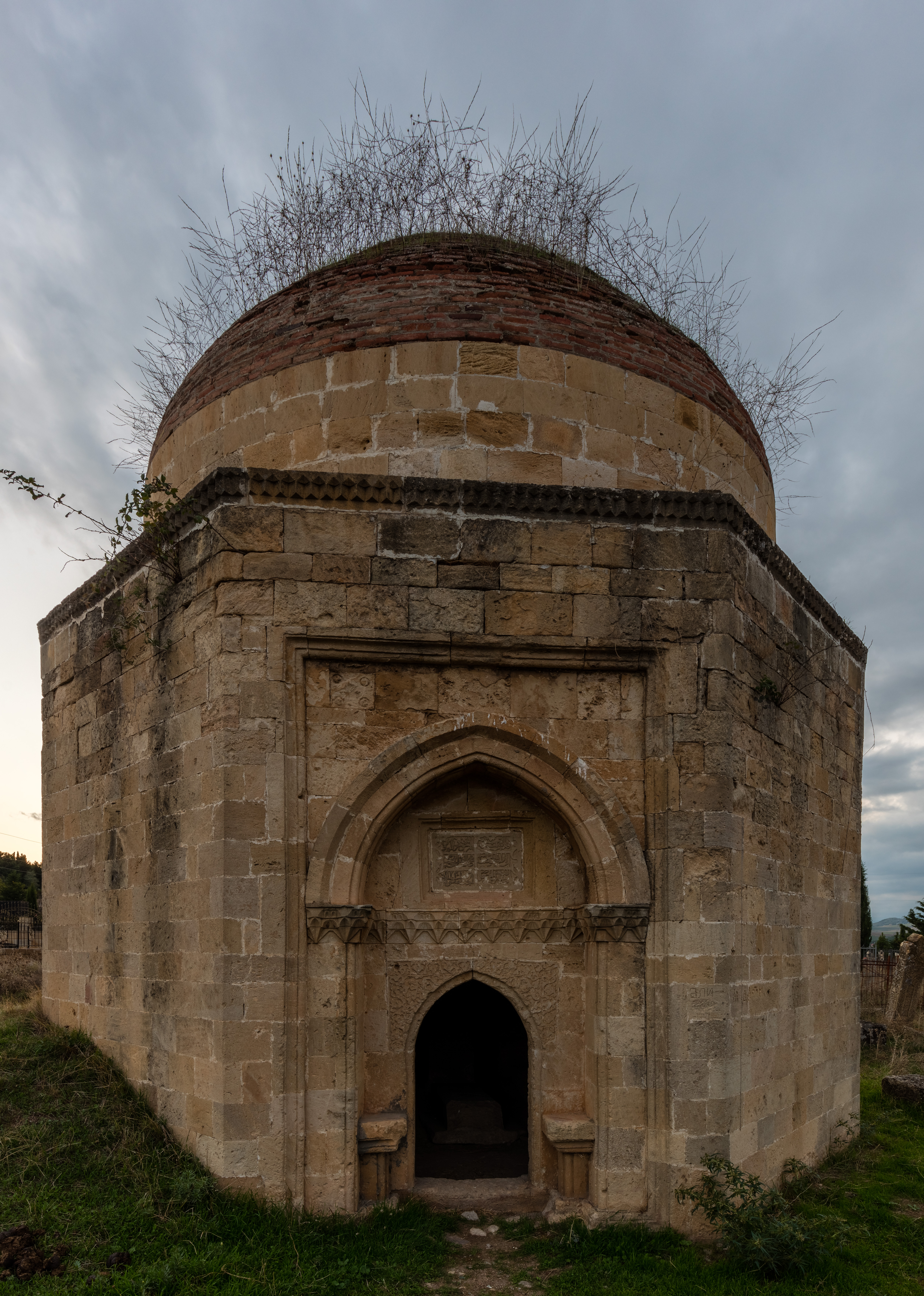
Detail view.

Shirvan Domes or Shamakhi mausoleum is a 15th-century mausoleum and graveyard in Shamakhi, Azerbaijan. It is located at the foot of the Gulustan Fortress.

The notorious representatives of the Shirvanshahs were buried there. The monument's name is defined be the number of gravestones in the crypt.

== History ==
In ancient times Shamakhi was the capital of Shirvan - the state of Shirvanshahs, which was established in the 18th century along with other smaller states after the weakening of the dynasty of Abbasids. The town has a glorious but tragic history - it has been devastated many times. And not only by invaders but also as a result of earthquakes since this is an area of high seismicity. When in 1191 Kizil Arslan of Atabeks Eldenisids dynasty seized and grounded the city Shirvanshah Ahsitan the 1st temporarily relocated the capital to Baku. However, in 1501 both Shamakhi and Baku were captured by Shah Ismail Sefevi. 37 years later Shirvan's existence as an independent state ceased and Tahmasib Sefevi founded the state of Sefevids. Afterwards Shamakhi was frequently destroyed in wars with Turkish Ottomans. Not only people were killed, architectural monuments and books were also destroyed.
