= Nakhchivan Memorial Museum =

Nakhchivan Memorial Museum is a museum in Nakhchivan, Azerbaijan. It offers 1200 exhibits about residents of Nakhchivan and its cultural heritage of Azerbaijan's history.

== See also ==
March Days
