= Əhmədalılar =

- Municipality
- Location within Azerbaijan Location within Karabakh Economic Region
- Coordinates: 39°26′15″N 47°20′08″E
- Country: Azerbaijan
- District: Fuzuli

Population
  - Total: 1,626
- Time zone: UTC+4 (AZT)

Əhmədalılar (also, Akhmedallar and Akhmedalylar) is a village and municipality in the Fuzuli District in the south of Azerbaijan. It has a population of 1,626.
