= Monument to Mirza Alakbar Sabir =

Coordinates: 40°22′07″N 49°50′04″E

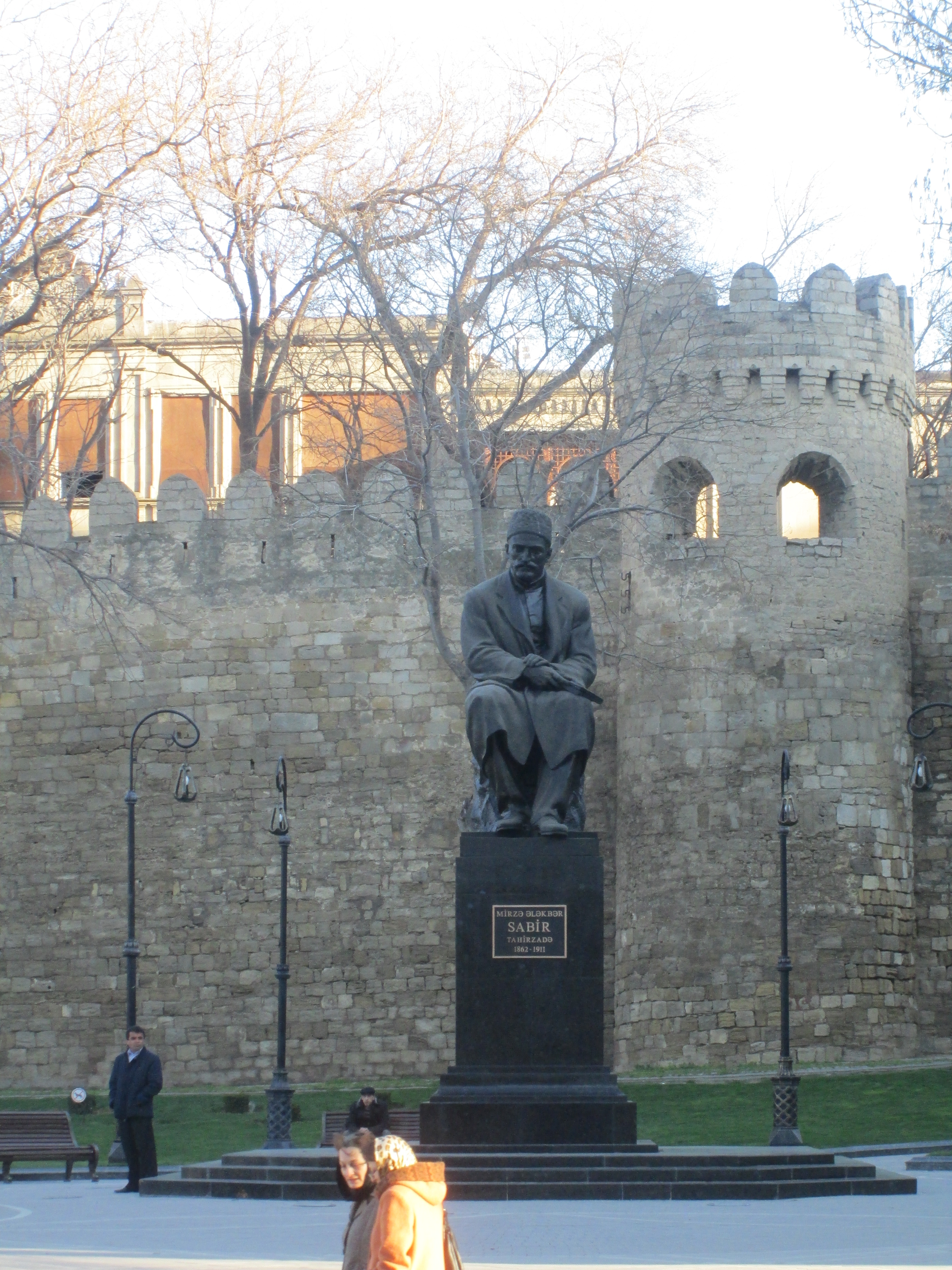
- Interactive map of Monument to Mirza Alakbar Sabir
- Location: Azerbaijan, Baku, Istiglaliyyat Street
- Type: Monument
- Completion date: 1958
- Dedicated to: Mirza Alakbar Sabir

A Monument to Mirza Alakbar Sabir was installed in 1958, in Baku, on Istiglaliyyat Street, in a park near Ismailiyya building. Its sculptor was Jalal Garyaghdi, and architects were H.Alizade and A.Ismayilov.

== History ==
The monument was installed in honor of the Azerbaijani poet Mirza Alakbar Sabir. The first monument was installed in 1922, and made by a sculptor Yakov Keulikhes and architect Y.Syryshev. Heights of pedestal of reinforced concrete sculpture was equal to 3,75 meters, but the figure of the poet was made standing up straight. Not long after it was decided to replace the monument with a new one and a solemn opening ceremony of the new monument to Mirza Alakbar Sabir installed at the place of the former one, was held on April 30, 1958. New bronze monument, made by sculptor Jalal Garyaghdi and architects H.Alizade and A.Ismayilov, was installed on a pedestal of dark polished granite – Labrador.
