= Qarğabazar, Fuzuli =

Qarğabazar
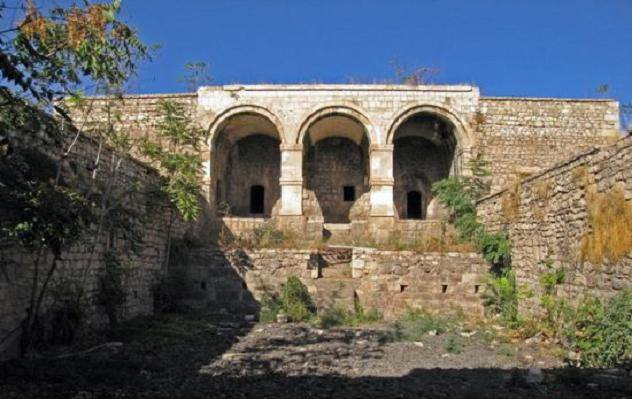

- Location within Azerbaijan
- Coordinates: 39°32′23″N 47°09′23″E
- Country: Azerbaijan
- District: Fuzuli
- Time zone: UTC+4 (AZT)

Qarğabazar (Garghabazar) is a village in Fuzuli District of Azerbaijan. It is located in the southern part of Fuzuli city, at the foot of Ilanlidag Mountain (559,7 m), at a height of 460 meters.

== History ==
The village was occupied by Armenian forces in 1993, during the First Nagorno-Karabakh War and all of its Azerbaijani inhabitants were forced out. Since 1993, the village was administrated as part of Hadrut Province of the breakaway Republic of Artsakh and renamed Ijevanatun (Իջեւանատուն). On 20 October 2020, Azerbaijan President Ilham Aliyev announced that the village had been recaptured.

== Notable sites ==
- Caravanserai built in 1681.
- Giyas ad-Din Mosque, built in the 17th century.
- There was a Russo-Tatar (Russo-Azerbaijani) primary school in the village during the pre-revolutionary period.

== Gallery ==
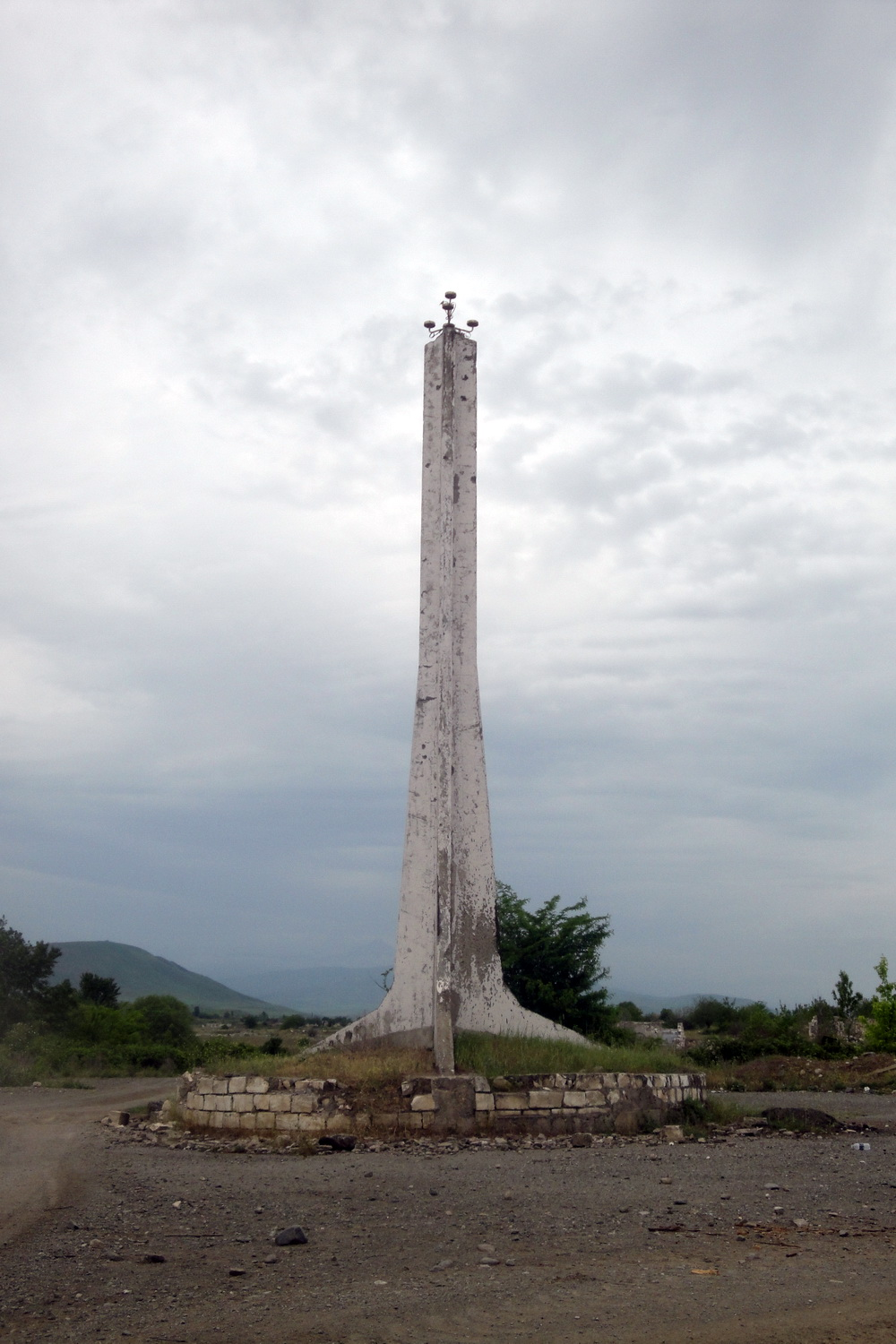

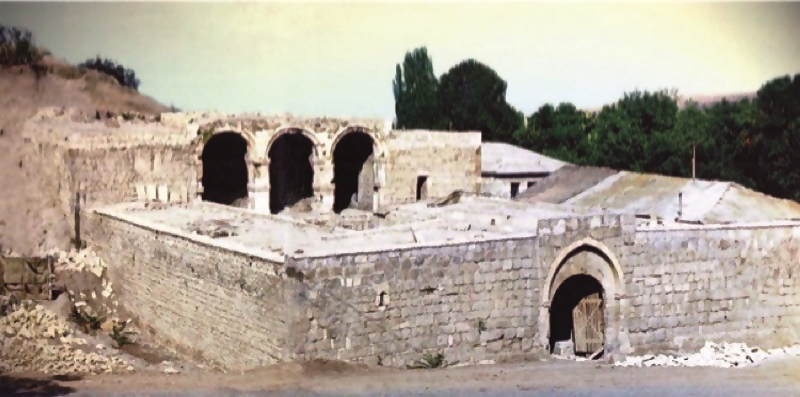
