= Kirna Mausoleum =

Cultic complex in Kırna village of Julfa District, Azerbaijan

- Kirnə türbəsi
- Location: Julfa District, Azerbaijan
- Type: Mausoleum

Kirna Mausoleum – is a cultic complex in Kırna village of Julfa District, Azerbaijan.

Kirna mausoleum is a square-shaped building with a cupola and, apparently, a fragment of the whole complex. Remains of muqarnas composition in the northern part of the monument and elements of the interior of an attached area testify to it. The monument belongs to tower-shaped monuments of the architectural school of Nakhchivan. One-celled mosques with dome also have such an architectural planning. But there is not any trace of mihrab. The general view of the mausoleum gives a cause that it was either a mausoleum or a mosque. The mausoleum is similar to Khanegah on the coast of the Alinjachay River because it also was built of burned brick, has a cupola and a square foundation of the cupola. The external parts of both mausoleums are pyramid-shaped with 16 faces. Muqarnas in the southern part of Kirna mausoleum testifies that the only part of the mausoleum saved till our days consisted only one part. It is difficult to determine the construction date of the monument because the ligature on it is destroyed. According to architectural features, the building can be dated to the 13th century.
