= Mammadbayli Mausoleum =

14th century site in Zangilan, Azerbaijan

Mammadbeyli Mausoleum
- Məmmədbəyli türbəsi
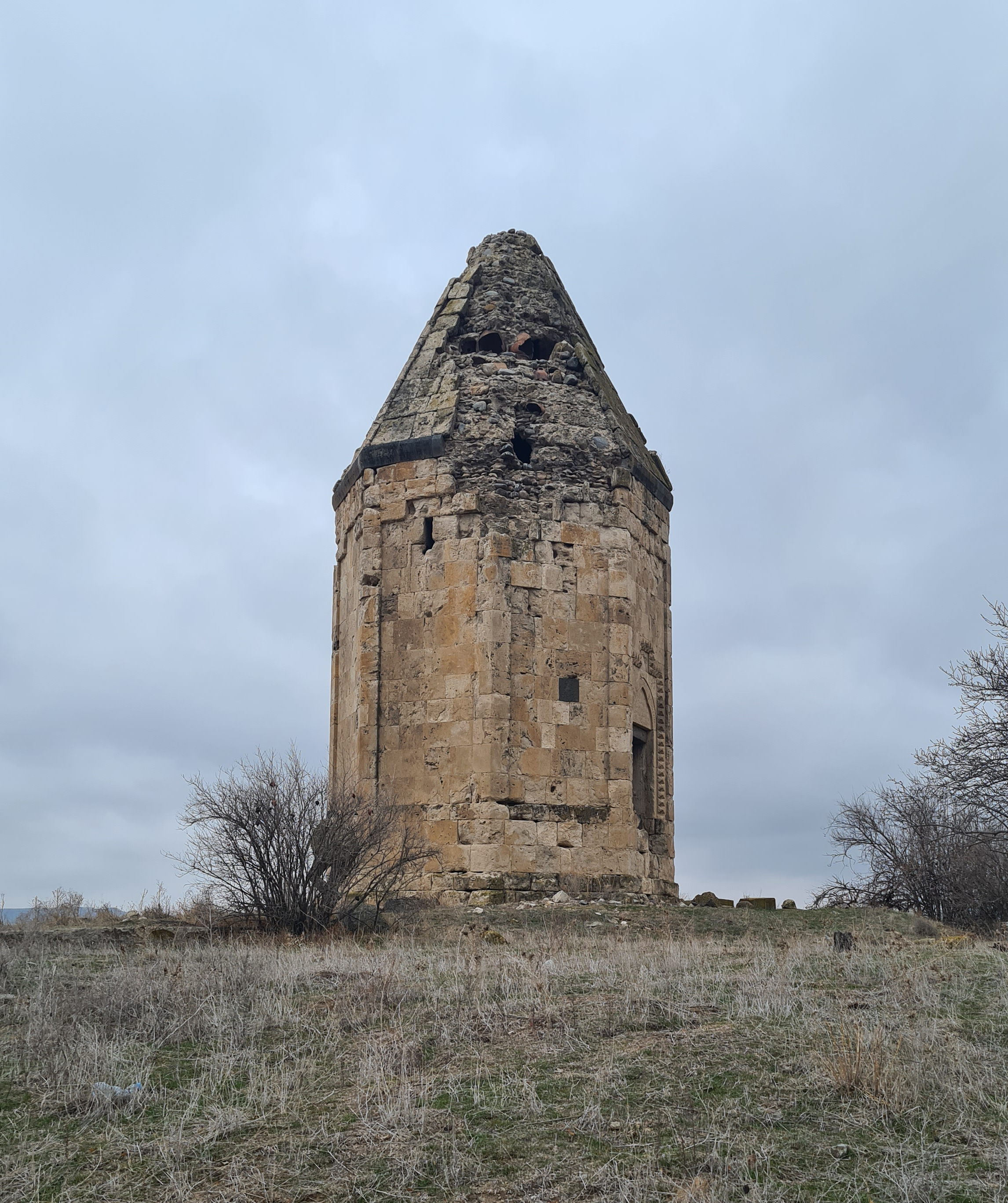
- Interactive map of Mammadbeyli Mausoleum
- Location: Məmmədbəyli, Zangilan District, Azerbaijan
- Coordinates: 39°09′36.6″N 46°48′07.8″E
- Dedicated to: Yahya ibn Muhammad al-Haj

Mammadbeyli Mausoleum (Azerbaijani: Məmmədbəyli türbəsi) or the Mausoleum of Yahya ibn Muhammad al-Haj is a mausoleum of the 14th century located on the uplands of the Mammadbeyli village of the Zangilan District of Azerbaijan.

== History ==
The mausoleum was built in 1305, by architect Ali Majid ad-Din on the Silk Road. In 1975, excavation works in the underground part of the mausoleum were carried out, as a result of which a sepulcher was found.

== Architecture ==
The mausoleum has a rectangular shape with dimensions of 2,95 x 3,30 meters. Entry of the sepulcher is located in the western part. The width of the door is 76 cm, and the height is 88 cm. According to the rules of Islam, the entry to the mausoleum shouldn't exceed 1.20 meters, so that the entering person would bow in respect to the memory of the deceased. In the Middle Ages, such mausoleums were built on graves of feudal nobility and well-known people. At present, the upper side of the mausoleum is slightly destroyed. The top of the mausoleum, which was built in the form of an eight-edged prism, is complemented with a roof in the form of a pyramid.

Its walls are thoroughly revetted with sharpened stones from inside and outside. But its sepulcher is quadrangular from the inner side. The door of the mausoleum is located at a height of 1.8 meters. The inner arch has a spherical, but the external a pyramidal form. Such types of constructions are typical for many monuments of Azerbaijan.

There is a ligature in Arabic language on the door entrance of the mausoleum. It says: “I - Yahya ibn Muhammad al-Haj, possessor of this building am a weak slave needing the grace of the great Allah and offered Ali Majid ad-Din to build this building in Ramadan month of 704th year.” (28.III-27.IV.1305). There are verses from the Quran at the beginning of the ligature, in a frame - II-16-18: 61-13: 65-35 (17, 20, 21).

== Gallery ==
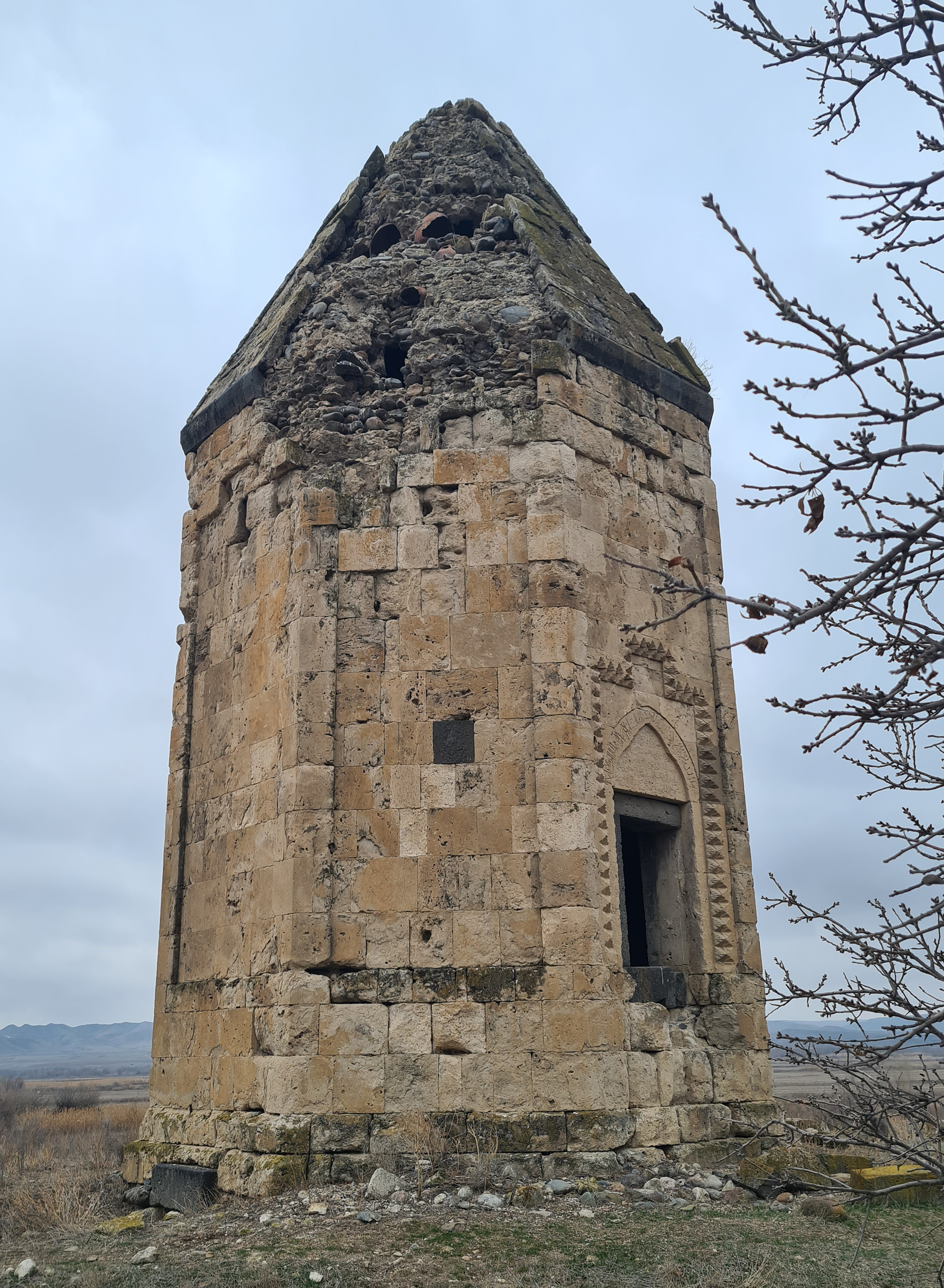

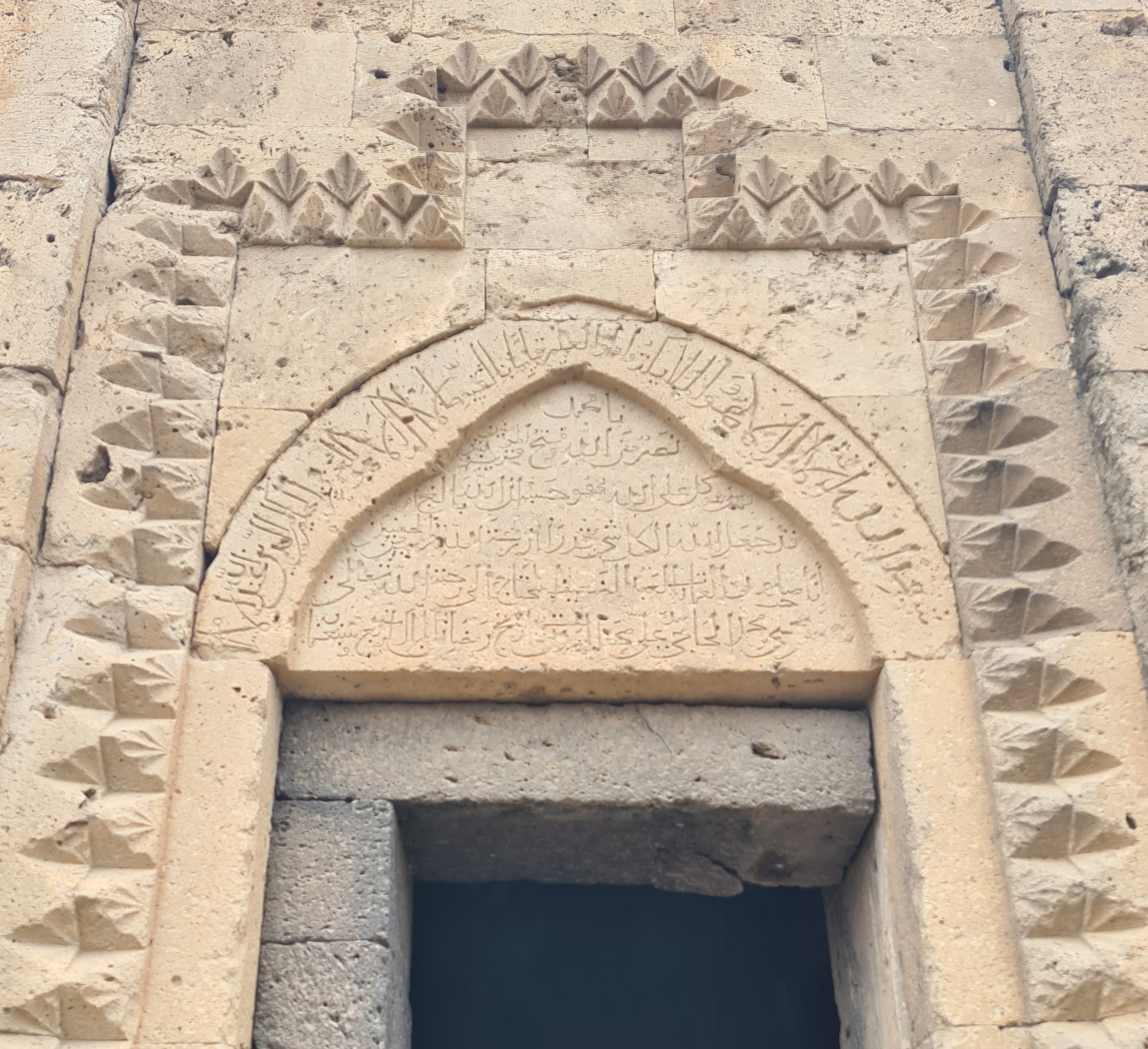

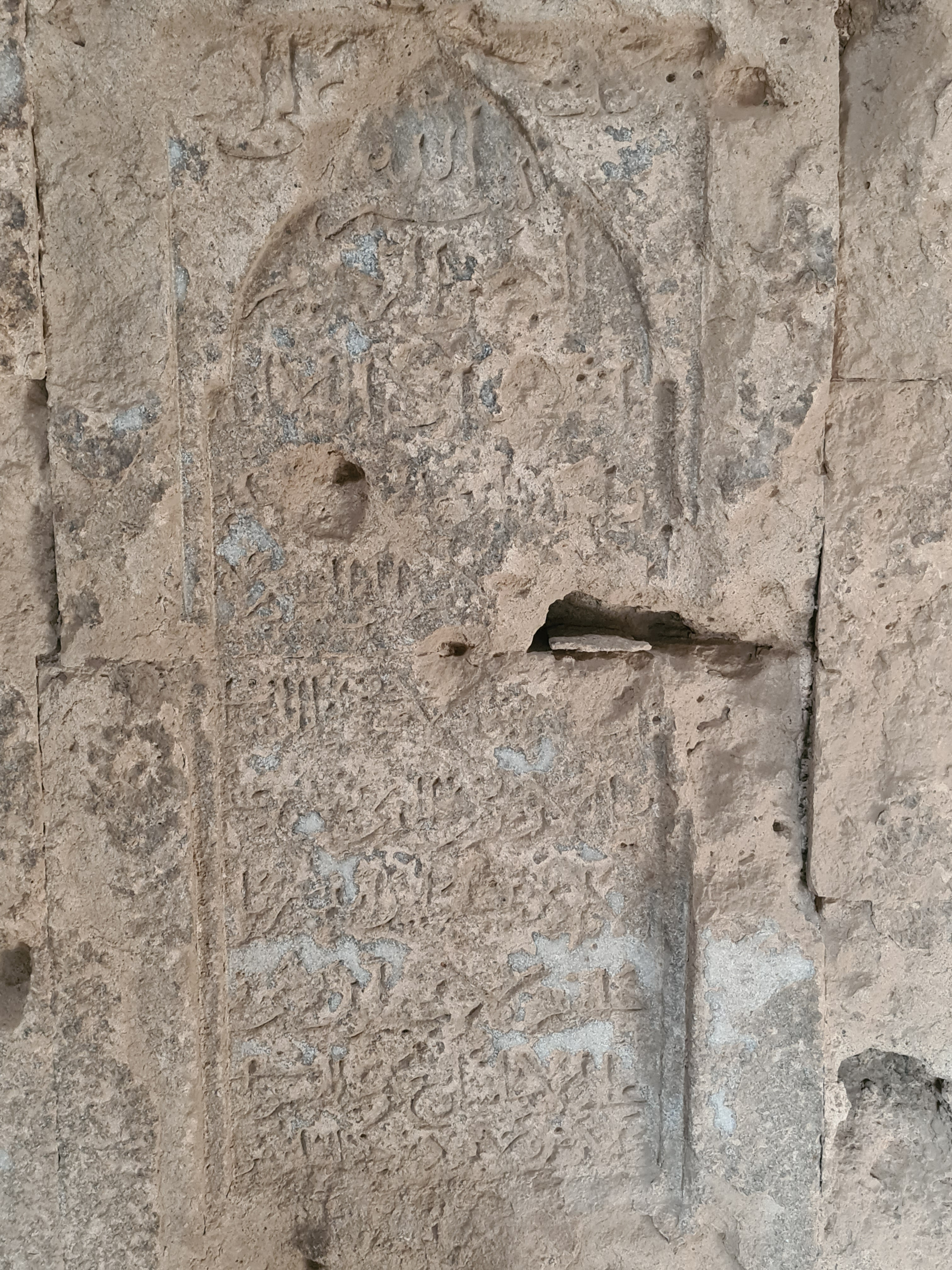

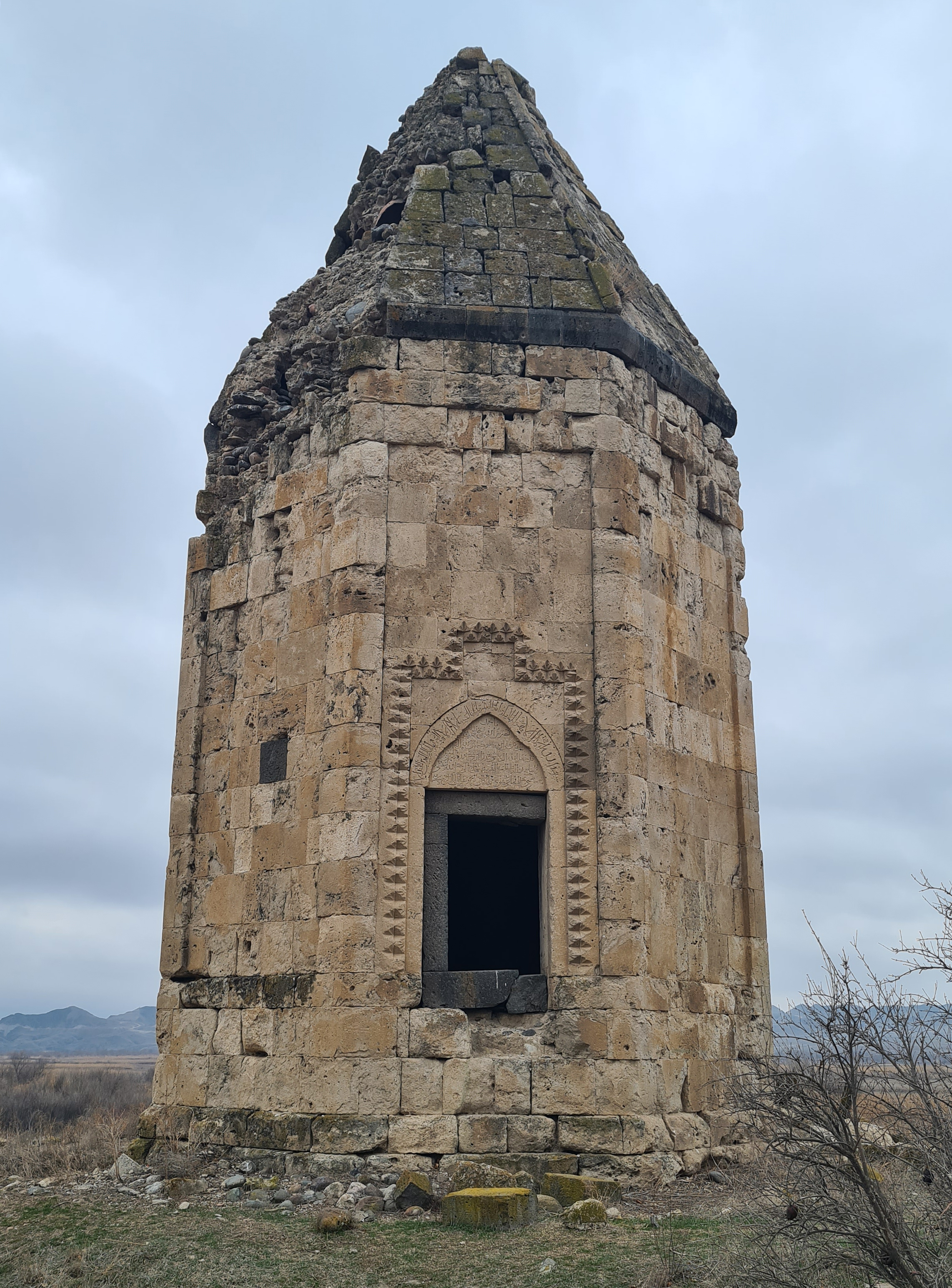

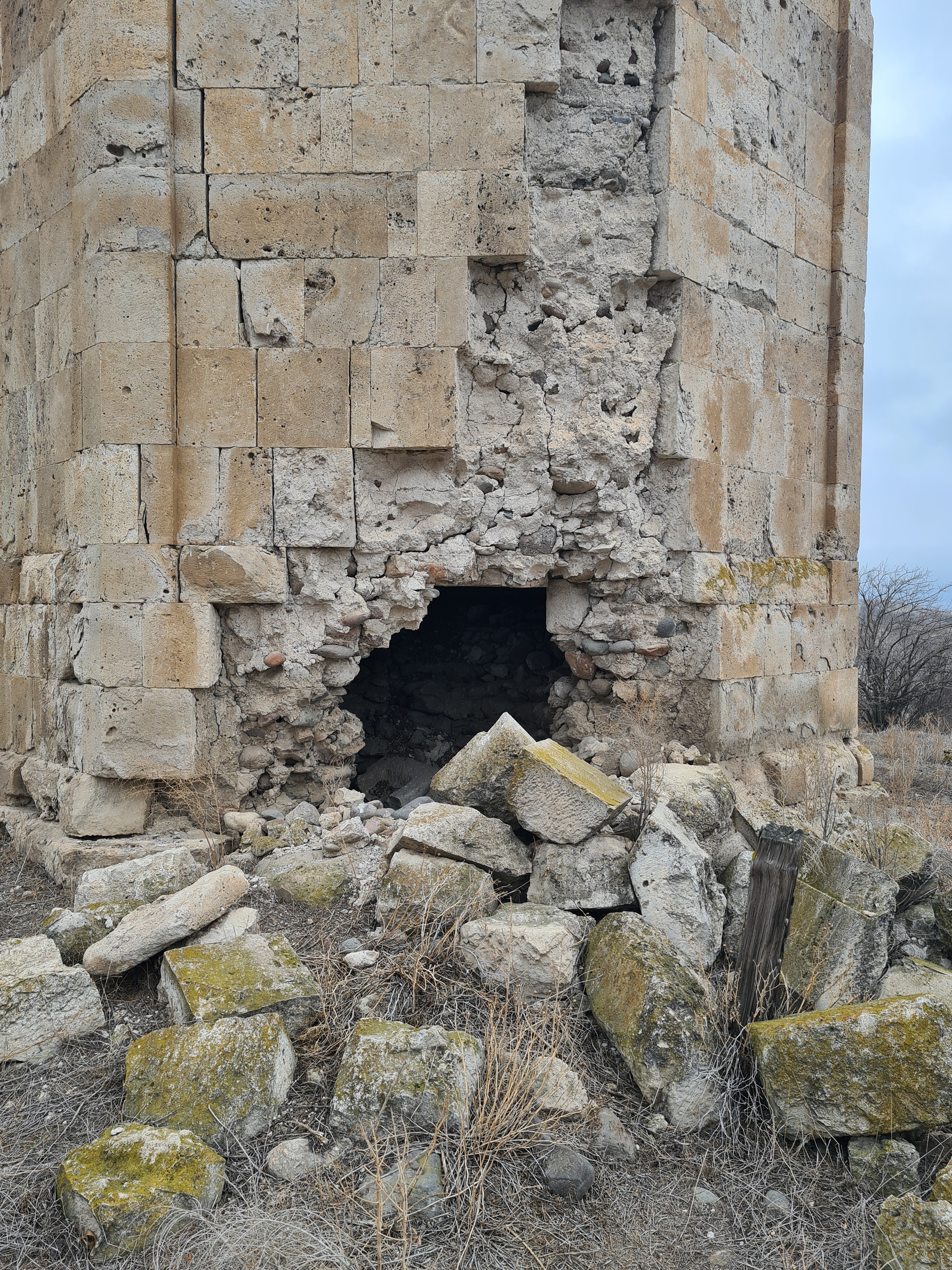

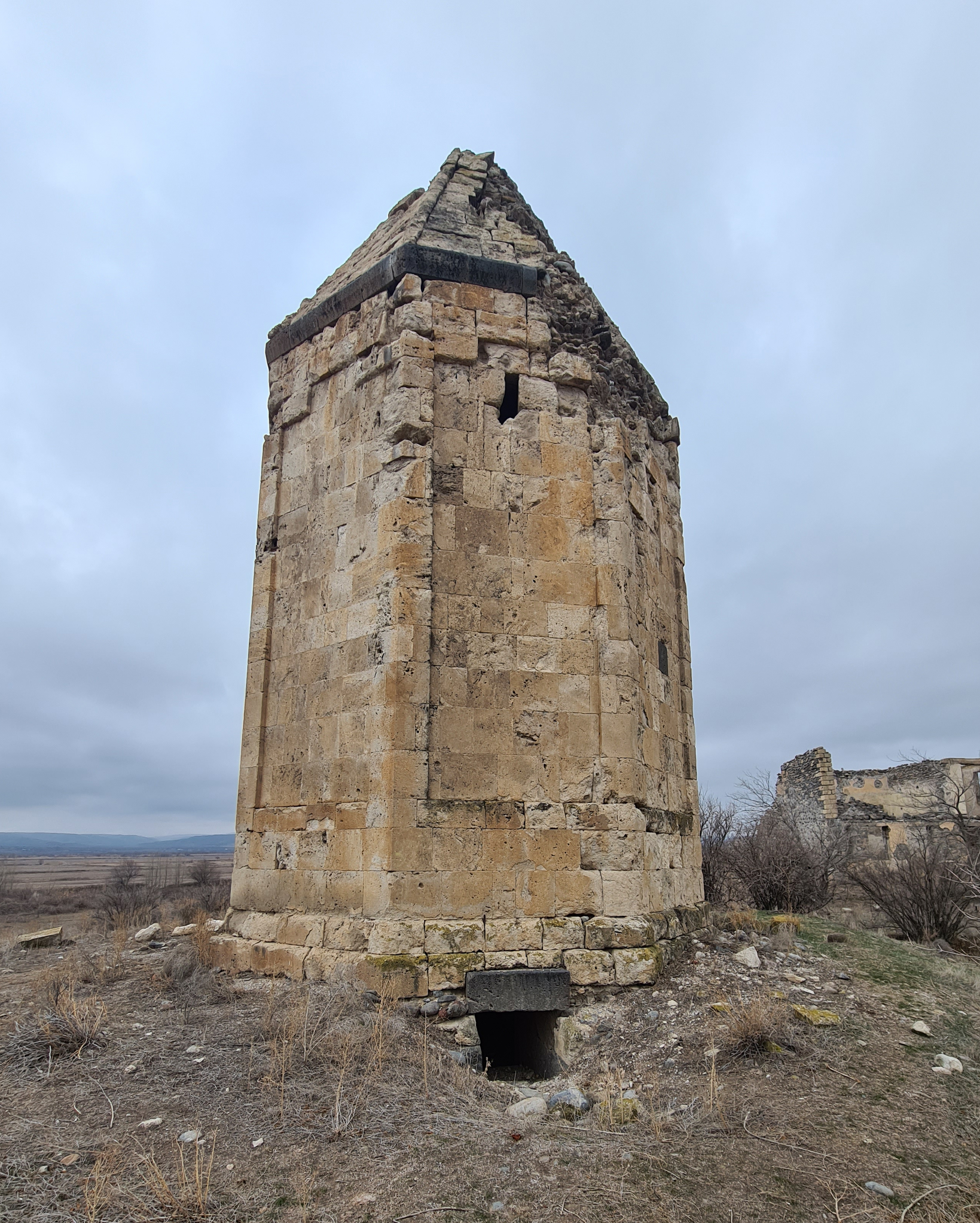

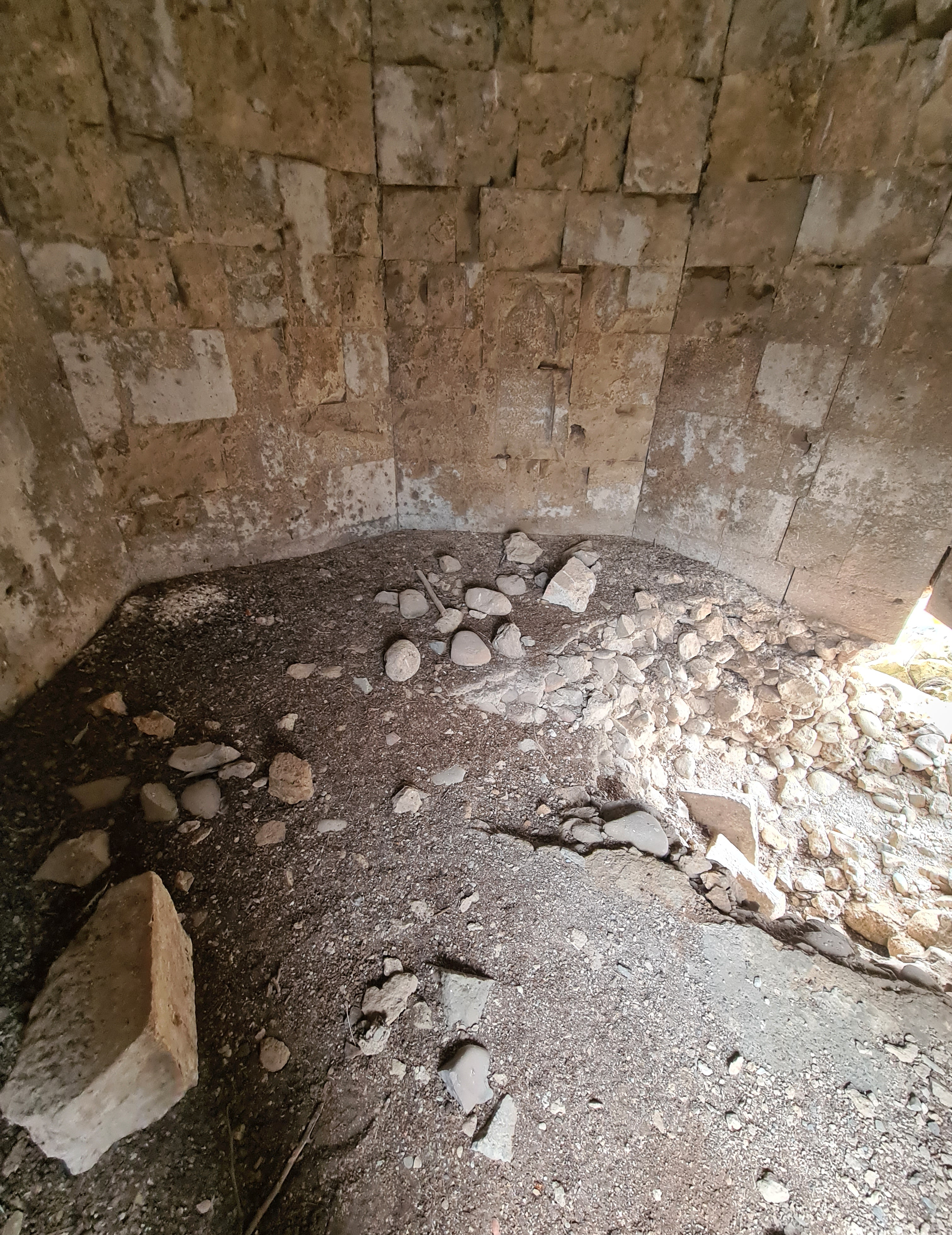
