= Gilahli Mosque in Sheki =

Mosque in Shaki, Azerbaijan

Gilahli Mosque in Shaki
- Azerbaijani: Şəkinin Giləhli Məscidi; Persian: مسجد گیله‌لی شکی
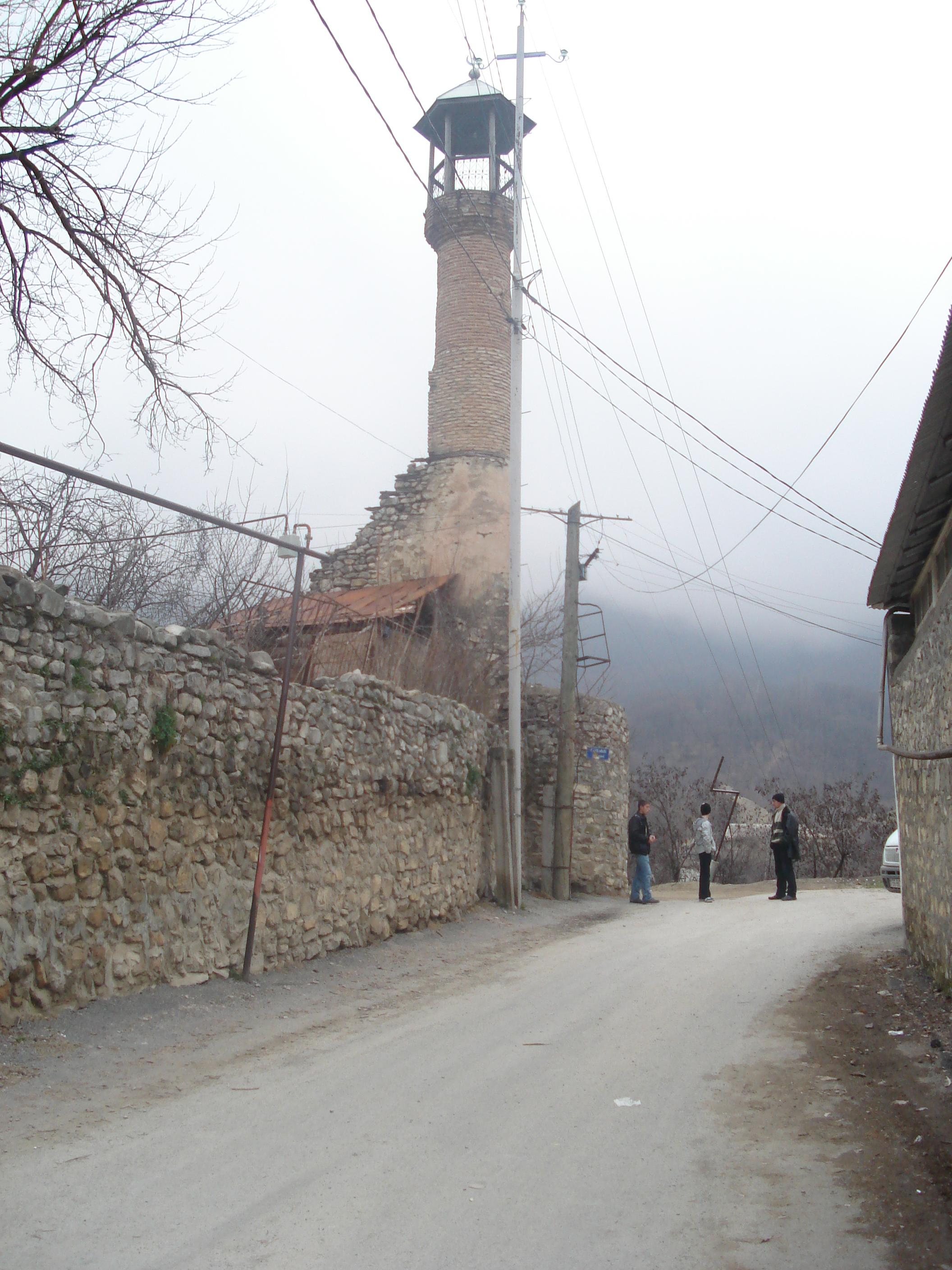
- The mosque minaret in 2009

- Location of the mosque in Azerbaijan

Religion
- Affiliation: Islam
- Ecclesiastical or organizational status: Mosque (1749–1928); Profane use (1928–1990); Mosque (since 1990)
- Status: Active

Location
- Location: Shaki
- Country: Azerbaijan
- Interactive map of Gilahli Mosque in Shaki
- Coordinates: 40°21′58″N 49°49′59″E

Architecture
- Type: Mosque architecture
- Funded by: Haji Chalabi Khan
- Completed: 1749

Specifications
- Minaret: One
- Minaret height: 13.5 m (44 ft)
- Materials: Brick; plaster

UNESCO World Heritage Site
- Official name: "Khan's Palace, Sheki's Historical Center"
- Criteria: Cultural: (ii), (v)
- Designated: 2019 (43rd Session)
- Reference no.: 1549

The Gilahli Mosque (Azerbaijani: Şəkinin Giləhli Məscidi; Persian: مسجد گیله‌لی شکی) is a mosque located in the historical center of Shaki, Azerbaijan. The mosque was constructed in 1749 by Sheki Khan Haji Chalabi Khan. In 1805, Haji Shamseddin Bey rebuilt the mosque in the same location. After this reconstruction, the mosque began to be known among the people as the "Haji Shamseddin Bey Mosque".

The mosque was included in the list of important immovable historical and cultural monuments of the country by the decision No. 132 of the Cabinet of Ministers of the Republic of Azerbaijan dated August 2, 2001. On July 7, 2019, as part of the "Khan's Palace, Sheki's Historical Center", the Gilahli Mosque was included in the UNESCO World Heritage List.

== History ==
The Gilahli Mosque was built in 1749 by Sheki Khan Haji Chalabi Khan. In 1805, Haji Shamseddin Bey rebuilt the mosque on the same site. After this reconstruction, the mosque began to be known among the people as the "Haji Shamseddin Bey Mosque."

In the early 20th century, a stone inscription belonging to the Gilahli Mosque was found buried under the ground near the mosque. Later, the inscription was placed on top of a fountain near the mosque. In 1936, Aleskerzade took a photograph of this inscription and wrote about it in a journal. Subsequently, this news and photograph were published several times in scientific publications. The fate of the inscription thereafter is not known.

The inscription on the mosque, translated into English, reads:

This honorable mosque was built by Haji Chalabi Sultan ibn Qurban, ruler of Sheki, governor of Shirvan, in the blessed month of Ramadan of the year 1162 AH (1748/1749 CE).

Previously, the cemetery located near the mosque was gradually washed away and destroyed by the Gurjana River over time. Some of the headstones that existed in the cemetery are preserved in various museums. The headstone of Haji Shamseddin Bey, who restored the mosque in 1805, is preserved in the Sheki History and Ethnography Museum. Haji Shamseddin Bey died in 1815 and was buried in the cemetery next to the Gilahli Mosque.

=== Soviet occupation ===
During the Soviet occupation, the struggle against religion officially began in 1928. In December of that year, the Central Committee of the Azerbaijan Communist Party transferred many mosques, churches, and synagogues to the balance sheets of clubs for educational purposes. If there were 3,000 mosques in Azerbaijan in 1917, by 1927 this number had decreased to 1,700, and by 1933, it had dropped to 17.

In the 1930s, a family in poor condition took up residence in the building of the mosque. Due to neglect for an extended period, the mosque fell into disrepair. Later, the building was dismantled, leaving only the minaret.

=== After Independence ===
The mosque was included in the list of significant immovable historical and cultural monuments of the country by the decision No. 132 of the Cabinet of Ministers of the Republic of Azerbaijan dated August 2, 2001.

In 2001, the historical part of Sheki city was selected as a nominee for the UNESCO World Heritage List. On July 7, 2019, together with the "Khan's Palace, Sheki's Historical Center," Sheki's historical center was included in the UNESCO World Heritage List. The Gilahli Mosque, located in the historical center of Sheki, is also included in the World Heritage List.

== Architecture ==
For the construction of the mosque, the vicinity of a deep cliff on the north-eastern part of Sheki city, near the riverbank, was chosen. The architecture of the Gileyli Mosque is close to the residential architecture of Sheki due to both its planning characteristics and the solution of its interior volume – numerous wall niches and polychrome decoration of the wall surface.

The mosque building, measuring 6 m × 12 m (20 ft × 39 ft) in rectangular shape on the plan, is supported by four wooden columns placed in the center of the building. The building of the mosque is constructed from a mixture of clay bricks and river stones mixed with hay and straw. The exterior walls are plastered with lime from the outside and decorated with colorful paintings from the inside. These colorful paintings are the main valuable elements of the monument.

The walls of the hall are covered with a layer of plaster, and on the ceiling, above the balcony level, geometric and floral patterns are drawn and later painted with colorful paints. The internal walls are divided into several sections by arches: up to 1.5 m (4 ft 11 in) from the floor, the walls are plastered with clay-straw mixture and covered with delicate plaster. Above these panels, there are semicircular niches with multistep arches. These arches are filled with geometric and floral patterns. Above the niches, there is a delicate cornice with plant patterns, and above it, there is an inscription band in Arabic. All this composition is completed with a cornice decorated with geometric patterns.

In the center of the southeast wall, there is a stalactite-shaped mihrab richly decorated with carvings and inscriptions. On the sides of the mihrab, there are also multistep niches with carvings.

=== Minaret ===
To this day, only the minaret of the former Gilahli Mosque has survived. The minaret, which reaches up to the dome, is 13.5 m (44 ft) high. The minaret is located at a high altitude to the dome. The supporting wall running horizontally in the direction of the mosque further enhances its strength and stability. The lower part of the supporting wall is made of stone, while the upper part is made of fired red bricks. Above the section that the supporting wall will protect, more than twenty stone corbels have been placed on the supporting wall. These corbels are attached to the sides with boards to protect them from rain, snow, wind, and sun, and are covered. Small windows are also placed here for light to enter. There is a carved wooden door for entering the minaret on the side of the corbel.

== See also ==
- Islam in Azerbaijan
- List of mosques in Azerbaijan
