= Khojaly Massacre Memorial (Baku) =

Coordinates: 40.3830°N 49.8739°E

- Ana Harayı
- Interactive map of Khojaly Massacre Memorial
- Location: Khatai raion, Baku, Azerbaijan
- Designer: Aslan Rustamov; Mahmud Rustamov; Teymour Rustamov
- Type: Memorial
- Material: Bronze, granite boulder
- Height: 8.6 m (28 ft)
- Completion date: 2007
- Opening date: 2008
- Dedicated to: Victims of the Khojaly Massacre

The Khojaly Massacre Memorial in Khatai raion, Baku, and the first public memorial in Azerbaijan dedicated to victims of the Khojaly Massacre.

== Construction and unveiling ==
The memorial was built in 2008, funded by the local government under the impetus of president Ilham Aliyev.

== Design ==
The memorial consists of granite boulders lying within a gravel bed, while the figure made from bronze. The height of the memorial altogether is 8.6 m. The monument depicts a mother with a dead child in her arms, which she presses to her heart. During construction of the memorial, sculptors were also used photographs taken Azerbaijani journalist Chingiz Mustafayev.
