= Garghabazar Caravanserai =

Garghabazar caravanserai
- Azerbaijani: Qarğabazar karvansarası
- Location within Azerbaijan

General information
- Type: Caravanserai
- Location: Garghabazar village, Fuzuli, Azerbaijan
- Coordinates: 39.539143°N 47.156952°E
- Completed: 1681

Garghabazar caravanserai (Azerbaijani: Qarğabazar karvansarayı) is a historic monument of XVII century. It is located in Garghabazar village, of Fuzuli District, in Azerbaijan.

== History ==
Sometimes referred as Shah Abbas caravansarai, the building dates from 1681 and it sits on a hill at Garghabazar village. The architect of the monument is unknown, since any inscriptions have been destroyed.

== Architectural features ==
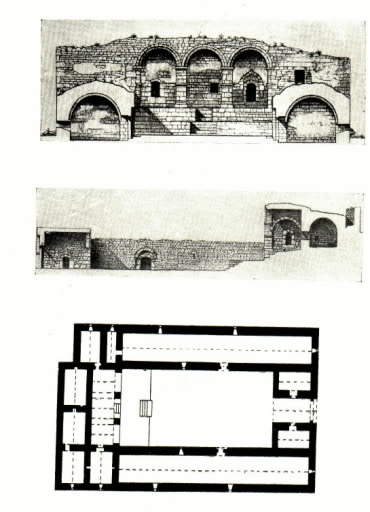
Plan and cross-section of the caravanserai

According to its architectural style, Garghabazar caravanserai is similar to architectural traditions of Albanian period.

The plan and architectural style of the caravanserai is made obedient to the general design by solving centered axis symmetrically. It consists of two large-sized camel stalls, two small rooms for guards on the right and left sides, 6 square-shaped rooms for caravanserai owner and merchants. The importance of these rooms is also reflected in the fact that they are built at the highest point of relief. Two high pavements were planted in front of these rooms according to their functions and relief.

The width of the caravanserai is 23.67 meters in width and 34.70 meters in length. The main mass of the monument was built of unhewn stone. It is in a rectangular shape with a corner cut. On left and right sides of the entrance, in front of guard rooms, there are two large flagstones. It is considered that guards used to stand on those flagstones. The doors of the rooms are opening to a medium-sized balcony. The balcony is decorated 3 semicircular piers.

There are special sewer lines in both halls of the caravanserai where camels were kept. This proves once again that in the Karabakh monarchy, sewage issues were still very much focused since ancient times.

== See also ==
- Architecture of Azerbaijan
