= Mausoleum of Seyid Yahya Bakuvi =

Historic site in Baku, Azerbaijan

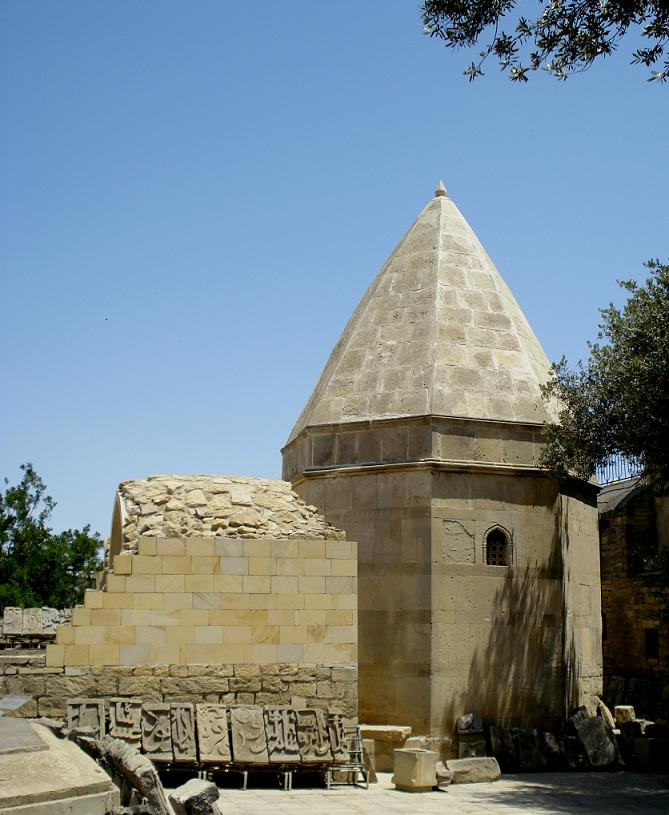
- The mausoleum (right) and mosque ruins (left), in 2008

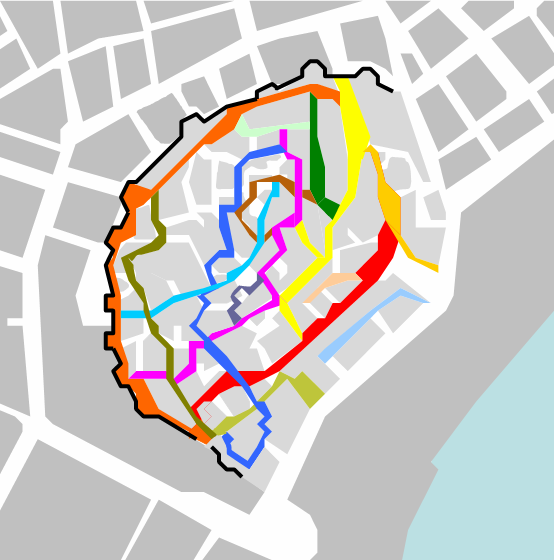
- Location within Streets in Old City, Baku, Azerbaijan

General information
- Type: Mausoleum
- Location: Old City, Baku, Azerbaijan
- Completed: 1457-1458

UNESCO World Heritage Site
- Official name: Mausoleum of Seyid Yahya Bakuvi
- Type: Cultural
- Criteria: iv
- Designated: 2000 (24th session)
- Part of: Walled City of Baku with the Shirvanshah's Palace and Maiden Tower
- Reference no.: 958
- Region: Europe/Asia
- Endangered: 2003–2009

The Mausoleum of Seyid Yahya Bakuvi was built in approximately 1457–1458, in the Old City of Baku, Azerbaijan. The mausoleum is located in the centre of the middle yard of the Palace of the Shirvanshahs. Among local people it is known as the mausoleum of “dervish” and was named after the philosopher and thinker Seyid Yahya Bakuvi who is buried in it.

The Mausoleum of Seyid Yahya Bakuvi forms part of the UNESCO World Heritage-listed Palace of the Shirvanshahs.

== Overview ==
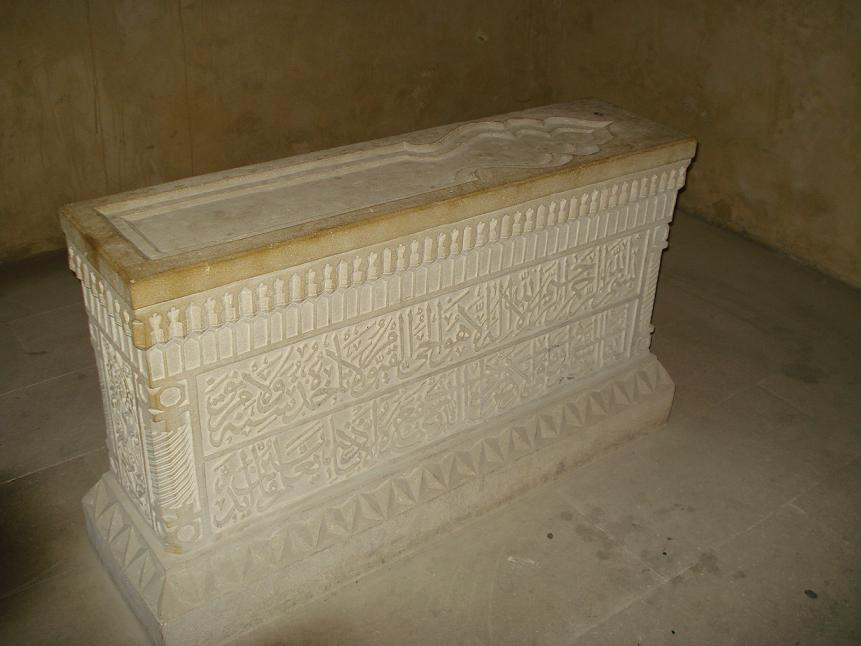
A grave stone in the mausoleum

The mausoleum is not large. It has an octagonal prismatic form and is covered with a conic stone cupola. This form is odd for monuments of Baku and Absheron. Such kinds of constructions are met beyond Baku and partially in Shamakhi Rayon.

The mausoleum is divided into two parts: overground and underground. The upper part of the mausoleum was used for accomplishment of cultic rites, but there was a burial vault. There are three small windows with stone shebeke-lattices in the southern, eastern and western facets of the mausoleum. The burial vault also has a window with shebeke-lattice. The whole mausoleum was revetted with narrow and wide rows of tightly urged to each other and finely carved stones. Ancient ornaments in the form of grid are saved within a cupola-shaped vault. Admixtures of wool fabrics strengthening the mausoleum were used in the plastering of its walls. Light cuts (up to 3 millimetres (0.12 in)) filled with colored mixture were made in plastering.

The mausoleum was attached to the Keygubad Mosque. Seyid Yahya Bakuvi worked, prayed and taught namely in this mosque. The mosque was built during Shirvansah Key Gubad's reign, in the 14th century, and was named after him. However, in 1918, the mosque was burned down during a fire and only the remains of its foundation exist.

The Mausoleum of Seyid Yahya Bakuvi is one of the best patterns of memorial architecture of the northern regions of Azerbaijan.
