= Həzrəoba =

Həzrəoba or Khazryoba may refer to:

- Həzrəoba, Khachmaz, Azerbaijan
- Həzrəoba, Qusar, Azerbaijan
