= Anykh-Kishlag =

Əniqqışlaq
- Location within Azerbaijan
- Coordinates: 41°39′29″N 48°35′03″E
- Country: Azerbaijan
- Rayon: Qusar
- Time zone: UTC+4 (AZT)
  - Summer (DST): UTC+5 (AZT)

Anykh-Kishlag (also, Əniqqışlaq) is a village in the Qusar Rayon of Azerbaijan.
