= Dzhibir-Kazmalary =

- Location within Azerbaijan
- Coordinates: 41°39′N 48°33′E
- Country: Azerbaijan
- Rayon: Qusar
- Time zone: UTC+4 (AZT)
  - Summer (DST): UTC+5 (AZT)

Dzhibir-Kazmalary (also, Dzhabir-Oba) is a village in the Qusar Rayon of Azerbaijan.
