= Torpaqkörpü =

- Location within Azerbaijan
- Coordinates: 41°44′15″N 48°32′59″E
- Country: Azerbaijan
- Rayon: Qusar
- Time zone: UTC+4 (AZT)
  - Summer (DST): UTC+5 (AZT)

Torpaqkörpü (also, Torpaq körpü, Toprakh-Kerpi, Torpakerki, Torpakerpi, and Torpakhkërpyu) is a village in the Qusar Rayon of Azerbaijan.
