= Dustair =

Dustair may refer to:

- Düztahir, Azerbaijan
- Düztahiroba, Azerbaijan
