= Mudzhukh-Kazma =

- Location within Azerbaijan
- Coordinates: 41°36′N 48°30′E
- Country: Azerbaijan
- Rayon: Qusar
- Time zone: UTC+4 (AZT)
  - Summer (DST): UTC+5 (AZT)

Mudzhukh-Kazma is a village in the Qusar Rayon of Azerbaijan.
