= Kazioba =

- Location within Azerbaijan
- Coordinates: 41°29′N 48°35′E
- Country: Azerbaijan
- Rayon: Qusar
- Time zone: UTC+4 (AZT)
  - Summer (DST): UTC+5 (AZT)

Kazioba is a village in the Qusar Rayon of Azerbaijan.
