= Çubuqlu =

Village and municipality in Azerbaijan

- Village and Municipality
- Location within Azerbaijan
- Coordinates: 41°34′N 48°34′E
- Country: Azerbaijan
- Rayon: Qusar
- Time zone: UTC+4 (AZT)

Çubuqlu is a village and municipality in the Qusar Rayon of Azerbaijan. It has a population of 459.
