= Country Life Vlog =

Azerbaijani YouTube channel

YouTube information
- Channel: @country_life_vlog
- Years active: 2019–present
- Genre: Cooking
- Subscribers: 8+ million
- Views: 2.9+ billion
- Last updated: August 23, 2026
- Website: www.countrylifevlog.com

Country Life Vlog (Azerbaijani: Kənd Həyatı) is an Azerbaijani YouTube channel filmed in the village of Hil in the Qusar region. The channel focuses on farm life and is also broadcast on television. It currently has 8.49 million subscribers. The main theme of the channel is to showcase the beauty of simple rural living.

== History ==
The creator of the channel, Amiraslan Ramikhanov, worked as a chef in Baku until the COVID-19 pandemic, and his mother, Aziza, who is the main character in the channel's videos, was also engaged in this profession in the village of Hil in Qusar. During the pandemic, Amirraslan returned to his village and started uploading videos to YouTube under the name "Country Life Vlog." He says, "I was born and raised in the village of Hil in Qusar. I am a professional chef and worked in Baku until recently. However, the quarantine left me unemployed. My mother Aziza and I created this blog back in May 2019, but due to my busy schedule, I couldn't dedicate enough time to it. Now, since I unexpectedly have free time, I can focus more on this work. Although my mother has a lot of responsibilities, such as agricultural work and caring for animals and the garden, she always finds time for our blog."

The channel mainly features dishes from Azerbaijani and Lezgian cuisine. English, Russian, and Chinese subtitles are added to the videos. The "Taste Life" channel, which has a wider audience, shared about ten of "Country Life's" videos when the channel had a small number of subscribers. The Ramikhanovs film their videos in their own fields and use the vegetables they grow in their cooking. A small decorative shed has also been built specifically for filming. The channel's popularity has led to interest from other video bloggers from Azerbaijan in this field.
