= Mausoleum of Sheikh Juneyd =

16th century site in Qusar Region, Azerbaijan

Coordinates: 41.5055°N 48.2487°E

- Şeyx Cüneyd türbəsi
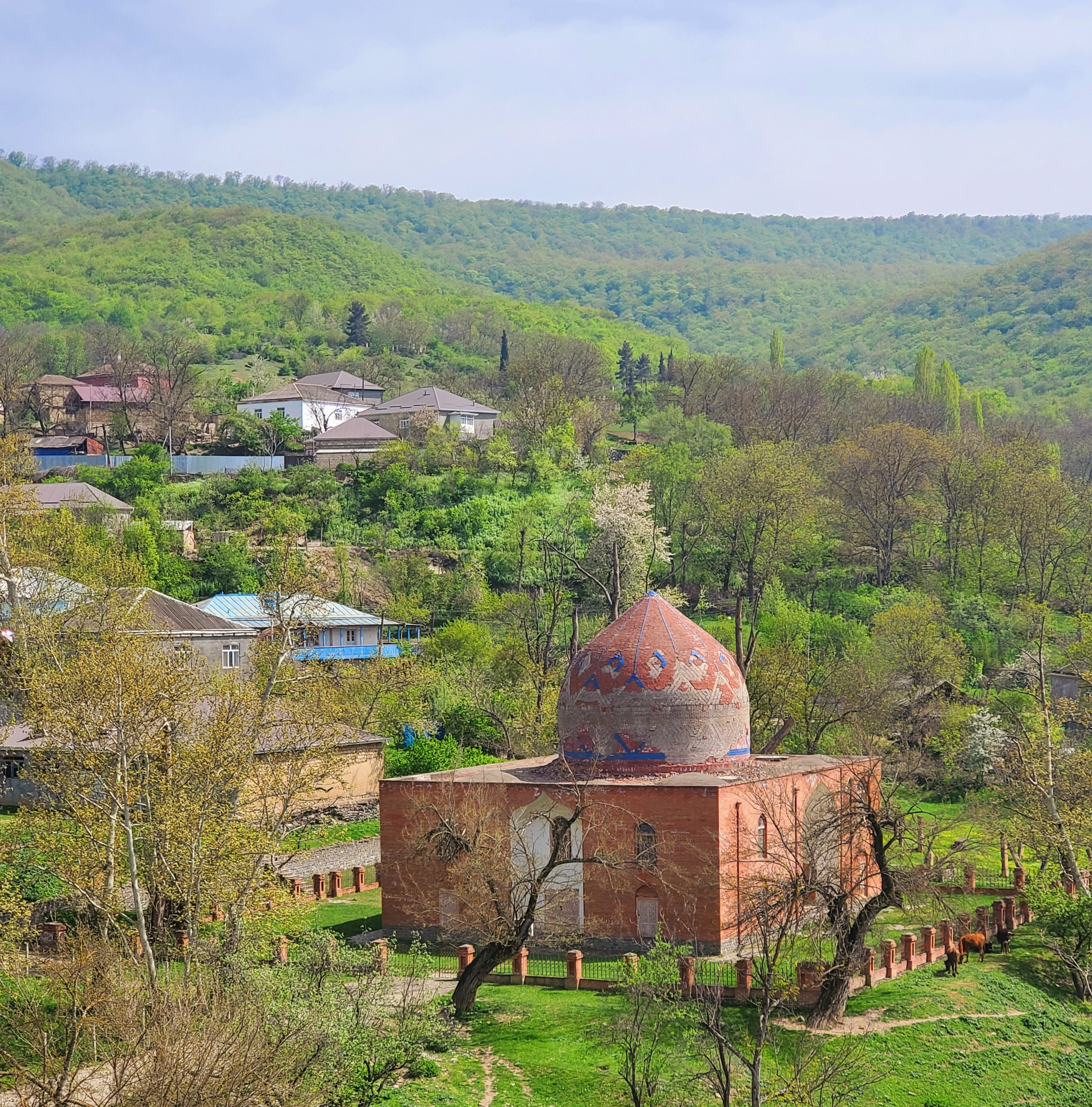
- Interactive map of Mausoleum of Sheikh Juneyd
- Location: Hazra village, Qusar Rayon, Azerbaijan
- Dedicated to: Shaykh Junayd

The Mausoleum of Sheikh Juneyd (Azerbaijani: Şeyx Cüneyd türbəsi) – is located in Hazra village of Qusar Rayon. Hazra village is not far from Azerbaijan’s border with Dagestan. From the history of the battle period between the Shirvanshahs and Ardabil sheikhs it is known, that Shaykh Junayd - grandfather of Shah Ismail I – perished in the battlefield with Khalilullah’s army in 1456 and was buried there. Construction of the mausoleum on his grave was carried out significantly later. A ligature on the northern façade of the complex evidences about it. Investigation of the building indicates that a part of the building, where the construction ligature is located now, has been attached to the building of the mausoleum later. Then it should be acknowledged that this ligature has been brought here from the main building during construction of the annex.

== History ==
There is also information that the remains of Sheikh Juneyd were brought to Ardabil in the 16th century. According to this information, it should be supposed that remains were brought to Ardabil significantly later after the construction of the mausoleum, or the mausoleum was built at the same time with displacement of the remains. Considering the fact that the Safavids were already the great rulers until the construction of the mausoleum, then it is quite possible, that after displacement of the remains of his ancestor perished in the battle for strengthening the power of the Safavid dynasty, shah Tahmasp I constructed this mausoleum as a monument to Sheikh Juneyd, giving the erection character of a sepulchral mosque. Indeed, the mausoleum has many similarities with domical mosques.

== Architecture ==
The mausoleum is quadrangular shaped with sides of 7.23 meters. There are apertures in all four walls of the building. From three sides – the western, eastern and southern – they are located in big niche-portals with the width of 4.67 meters in the depth of 2.9 meters. The origination of small rooms in the corners, apparently, used as auxiliary rooms, is connected with the presence of these portal-niches, which are compositional elements of the façade. There is access to the cupola from the south-eastern cell-rooms, which is at the level of its foundation. The inner walls of the mausoleum with the heights of 1.42 meters are faced with quadrangular glazed plates of two colors – blue and dark-violet, placed in staggered order. It should be mentioned that the glaze is of low quality – its surface is not smooth, it is covered with cracks and is porous.

Stalactite work including a passage from the quadrangular foundation to the cupola is determining details of the interior. For showing their dominating importance in the interior of the mausoleum, it is enough to show that the heights of the stalactite band reach to approximately 4 meters (3,88). Due to their large cells, stalactites are perceived as constructive elements of the building at first sight. The heights of the first raw of stalactites is 1.87 meters, but the second is 1.7 meters. There is a cupola on the upper stalactite band, which has a conical shape from the inner side. The whole surface of the walls and stalactites is covered with plaster, except the lower part, which is covered with glazed plates. The interior of the mausoleum amazes with its greatness. Such an impression is related to the general scale of divisions and especially a trumpet arch of stalactites.

The northern wing of the mausoleum is undoubtedly a later annex. It is apparent not only from the whole plan of the building, with which this annex is not harmonized compositionally, but also from the fact that the walls of the annex are only attached to the wall of the mausoleum and are not its continuation.

== Gallery ==
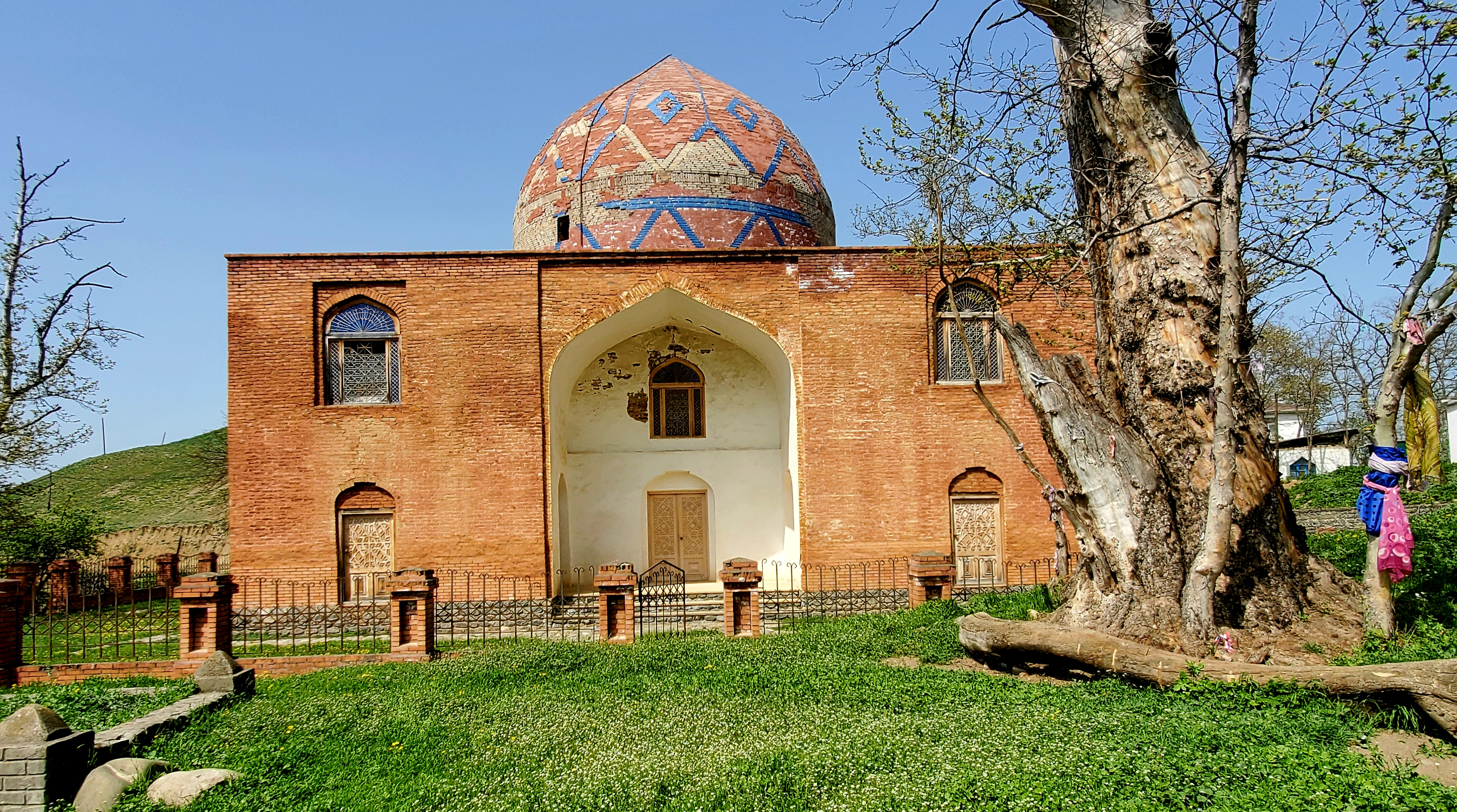

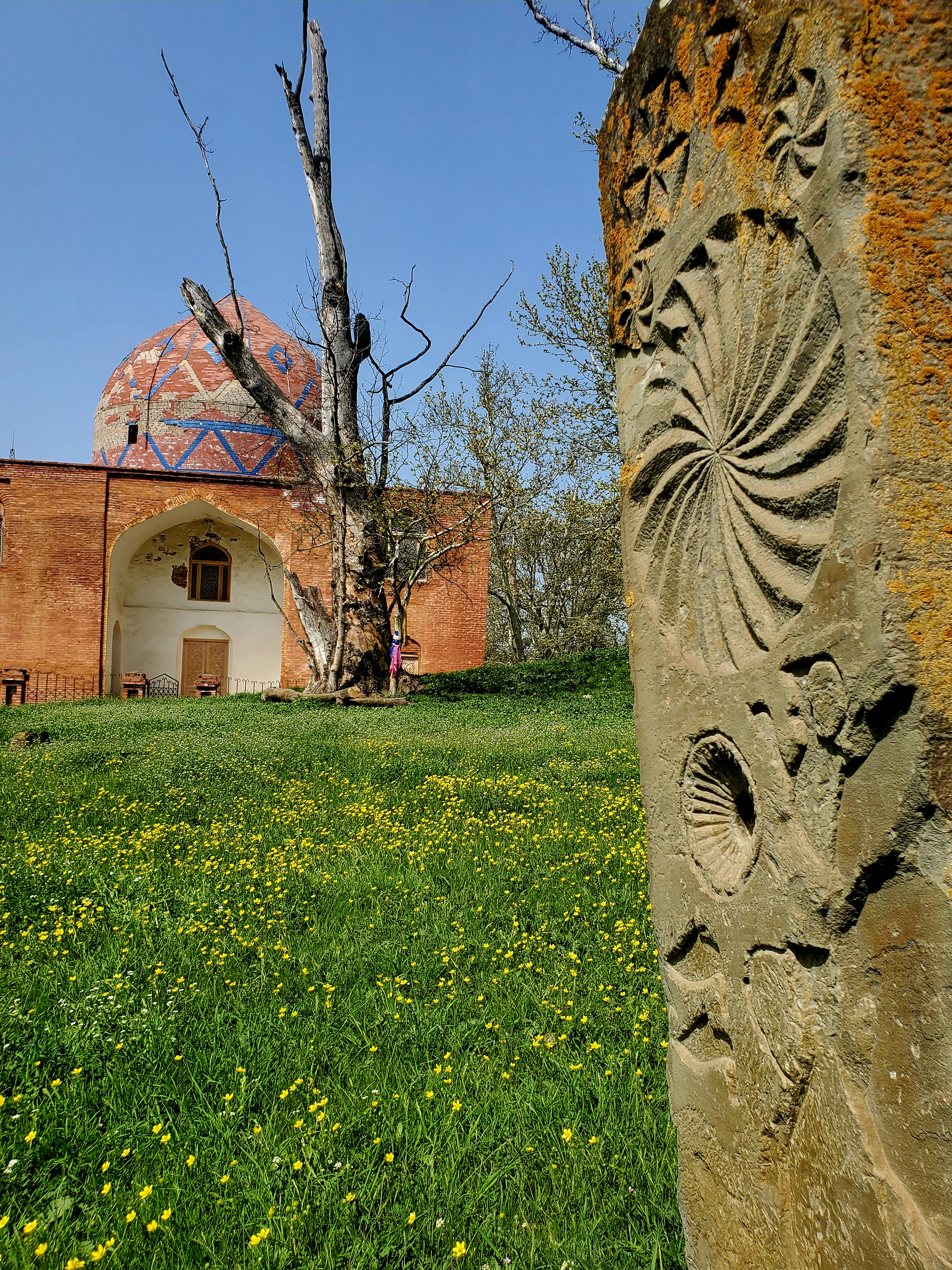

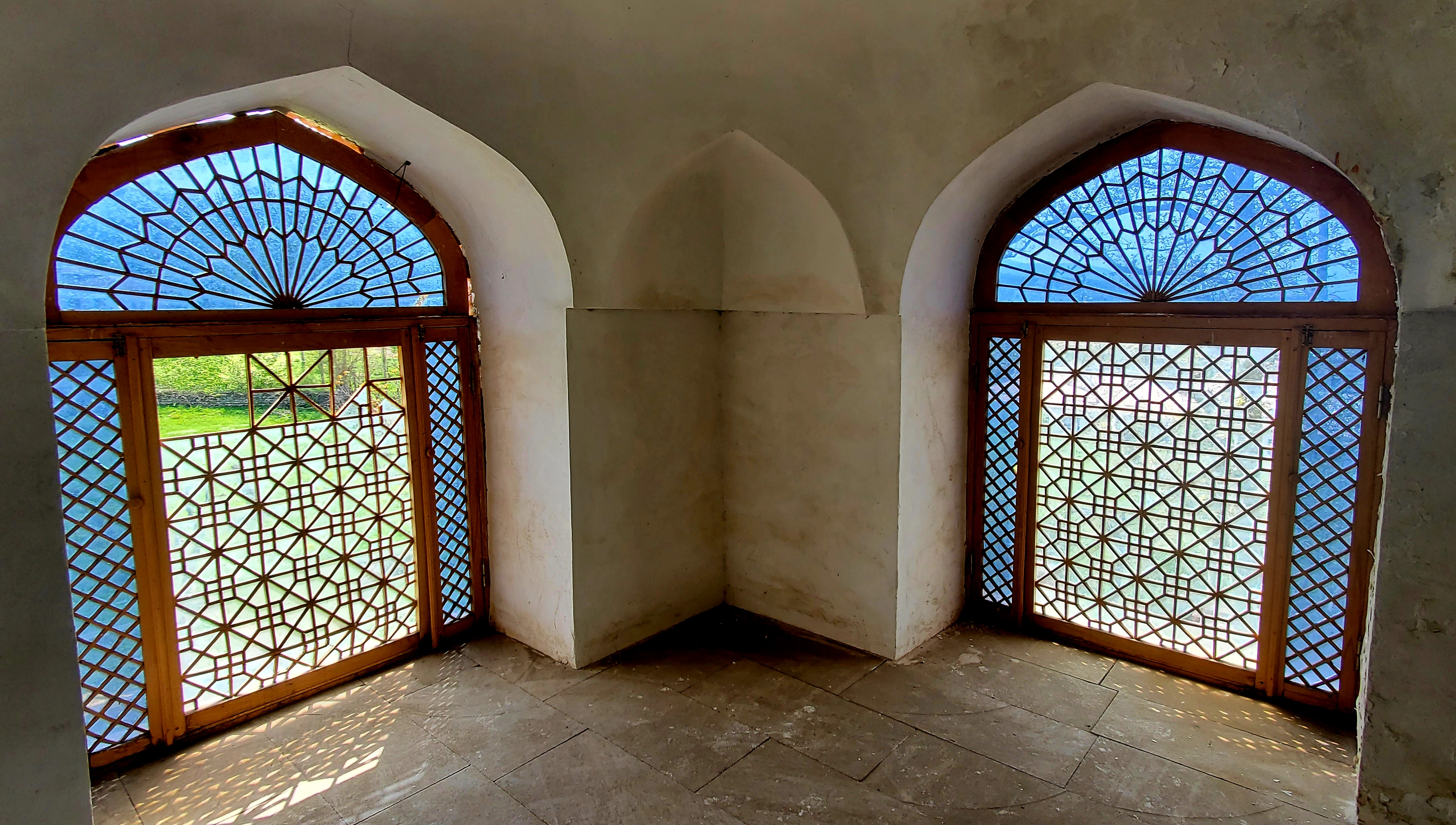

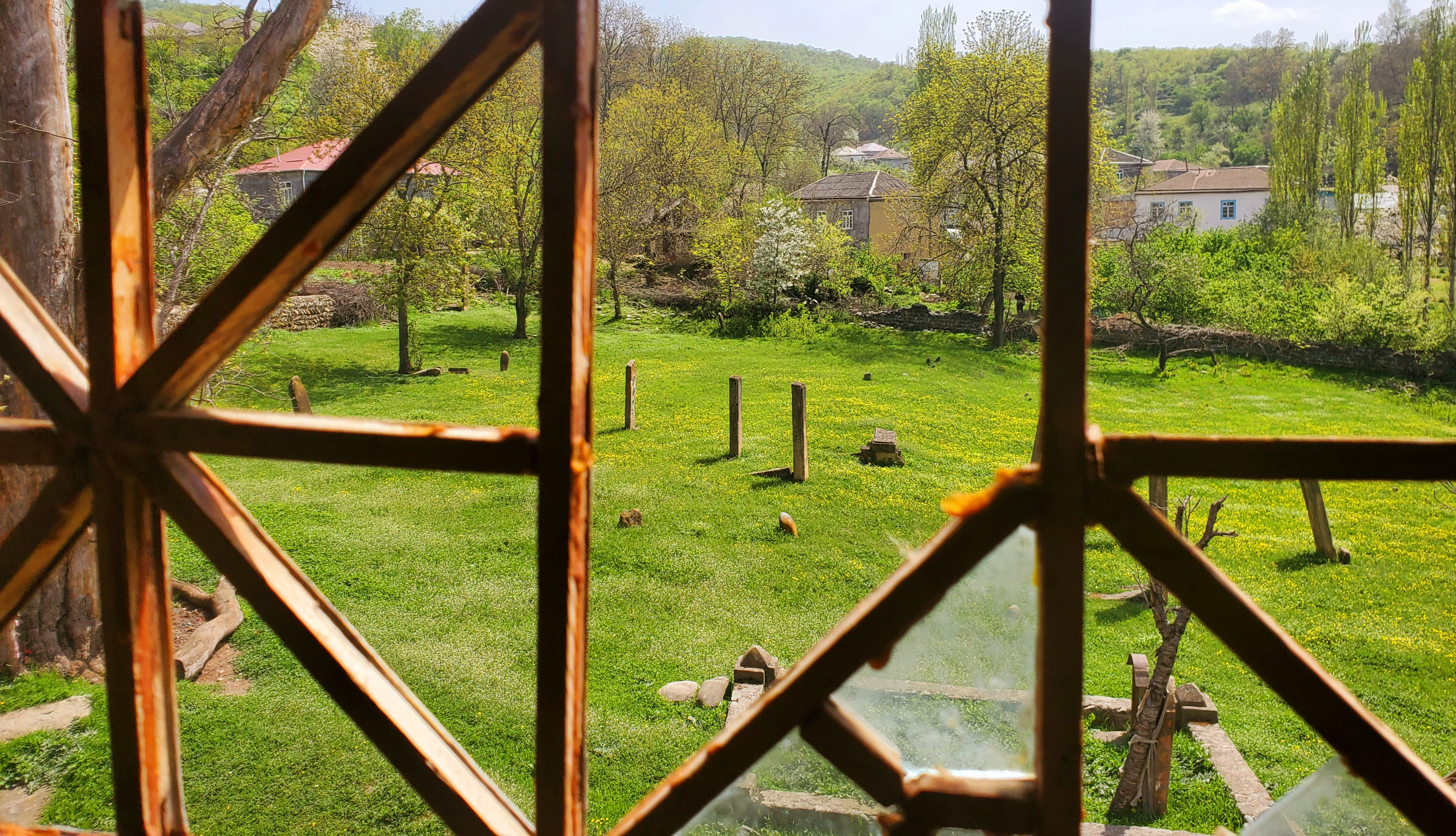

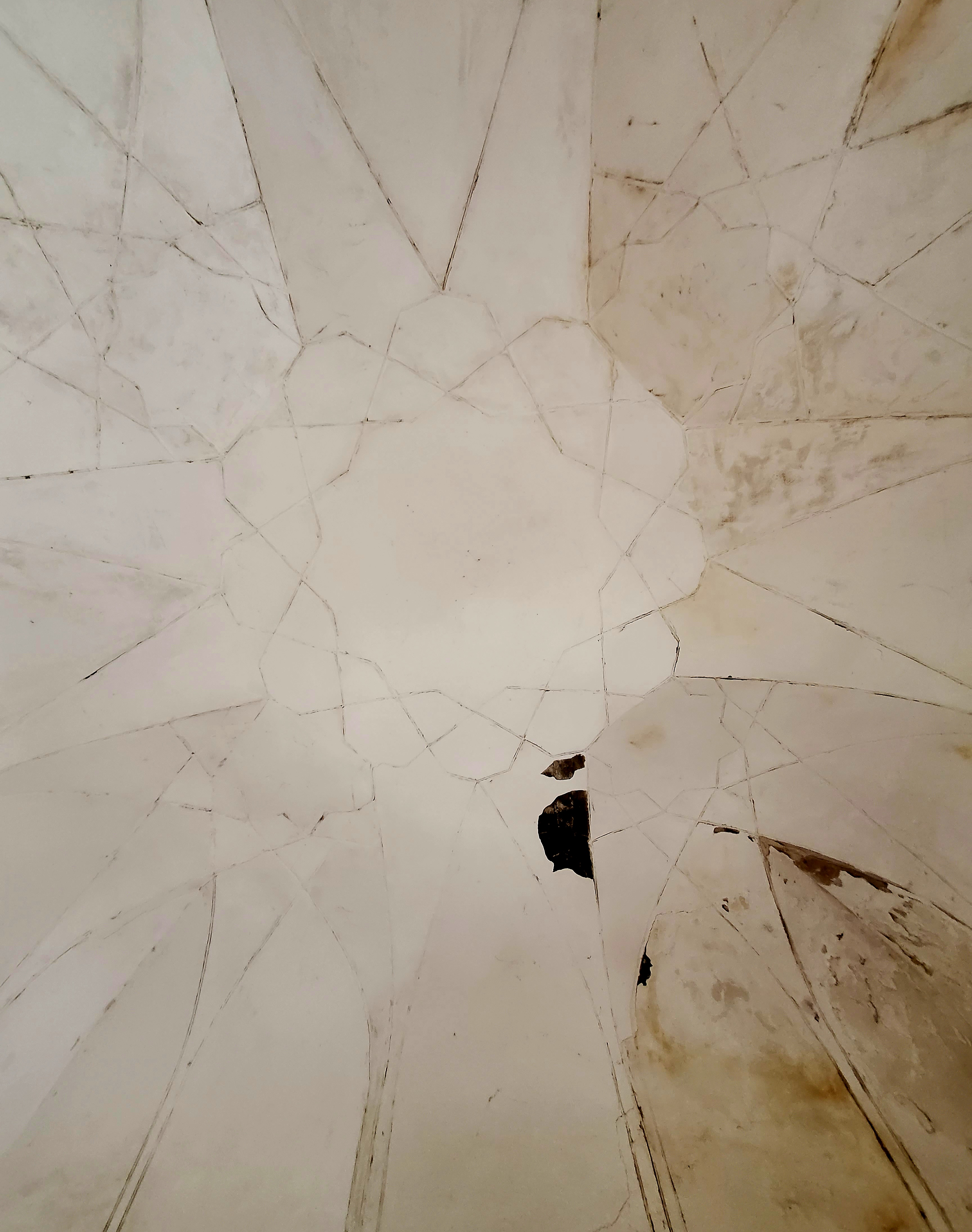

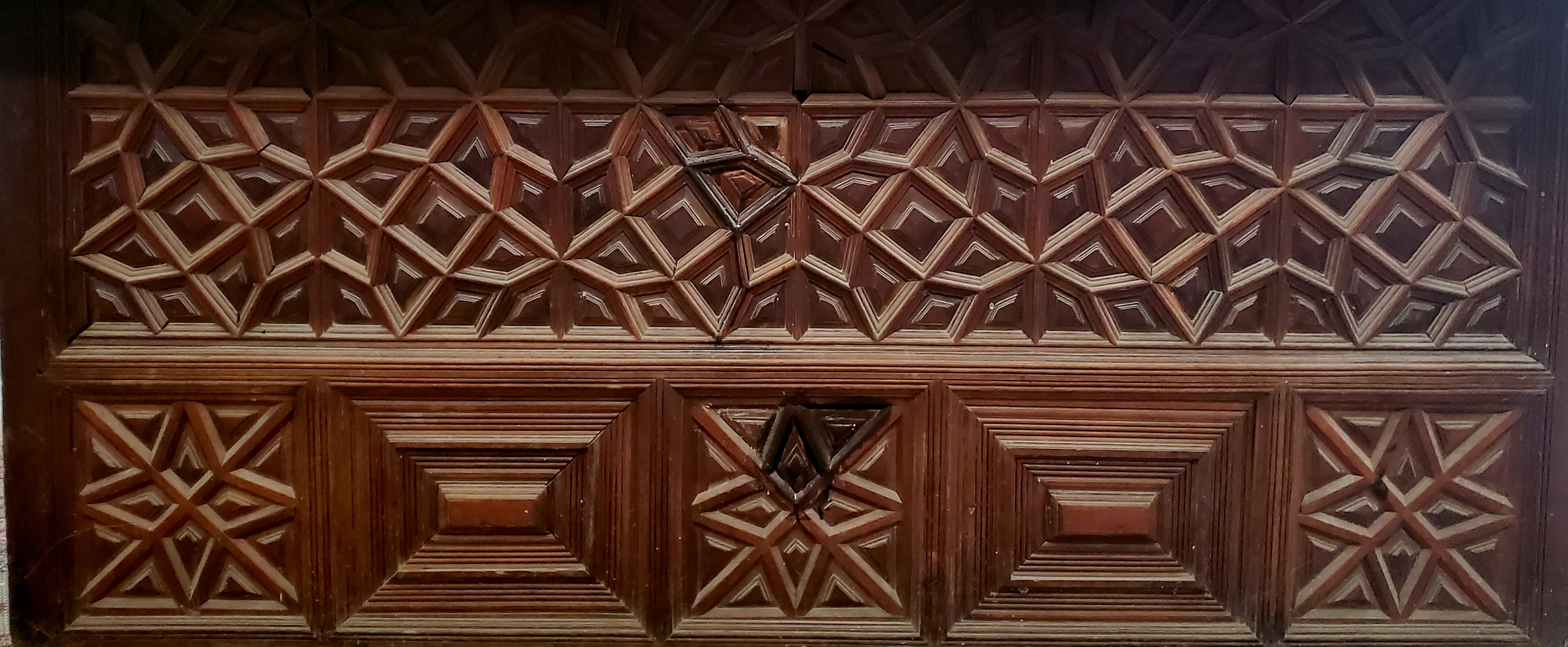

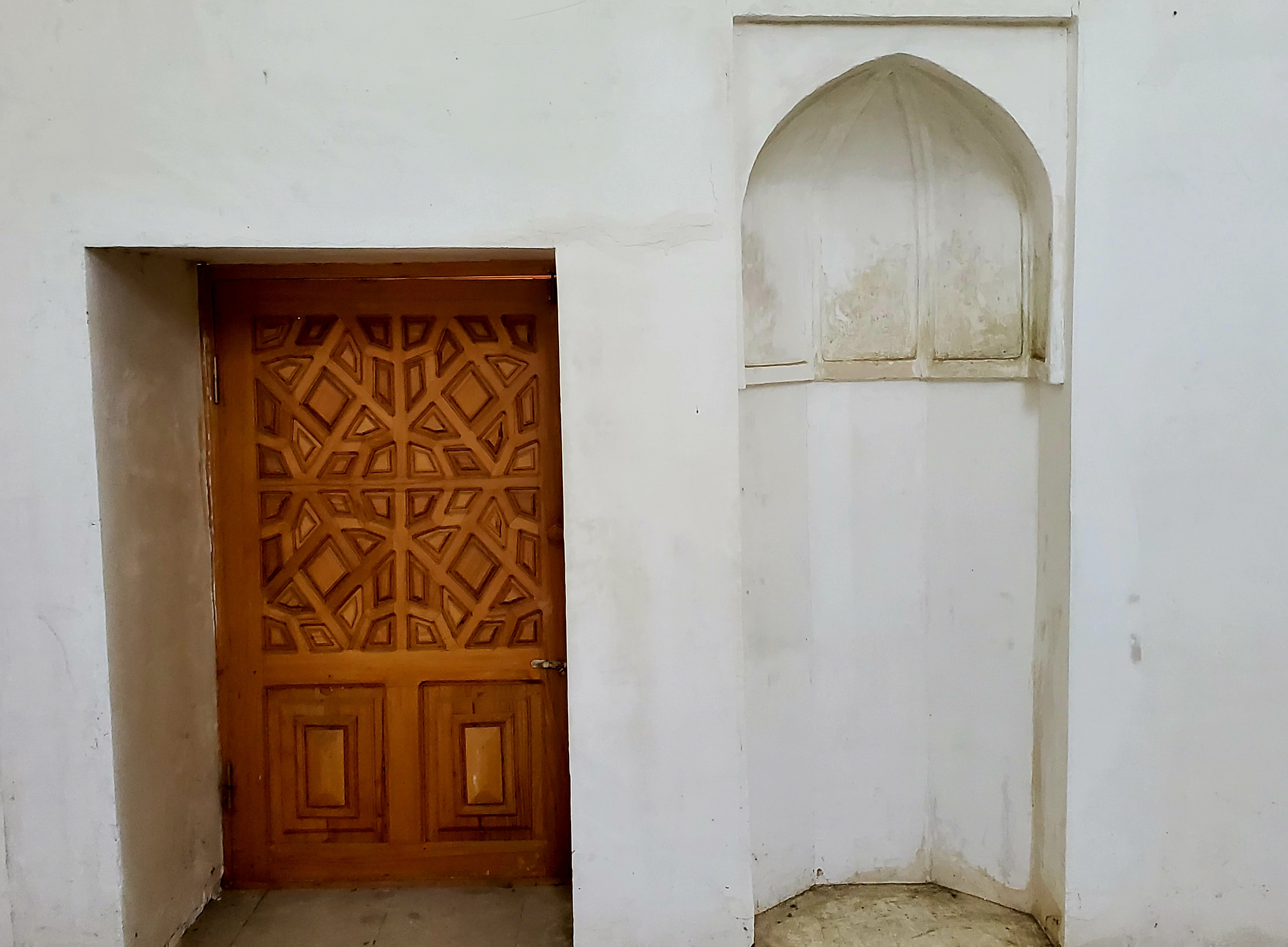

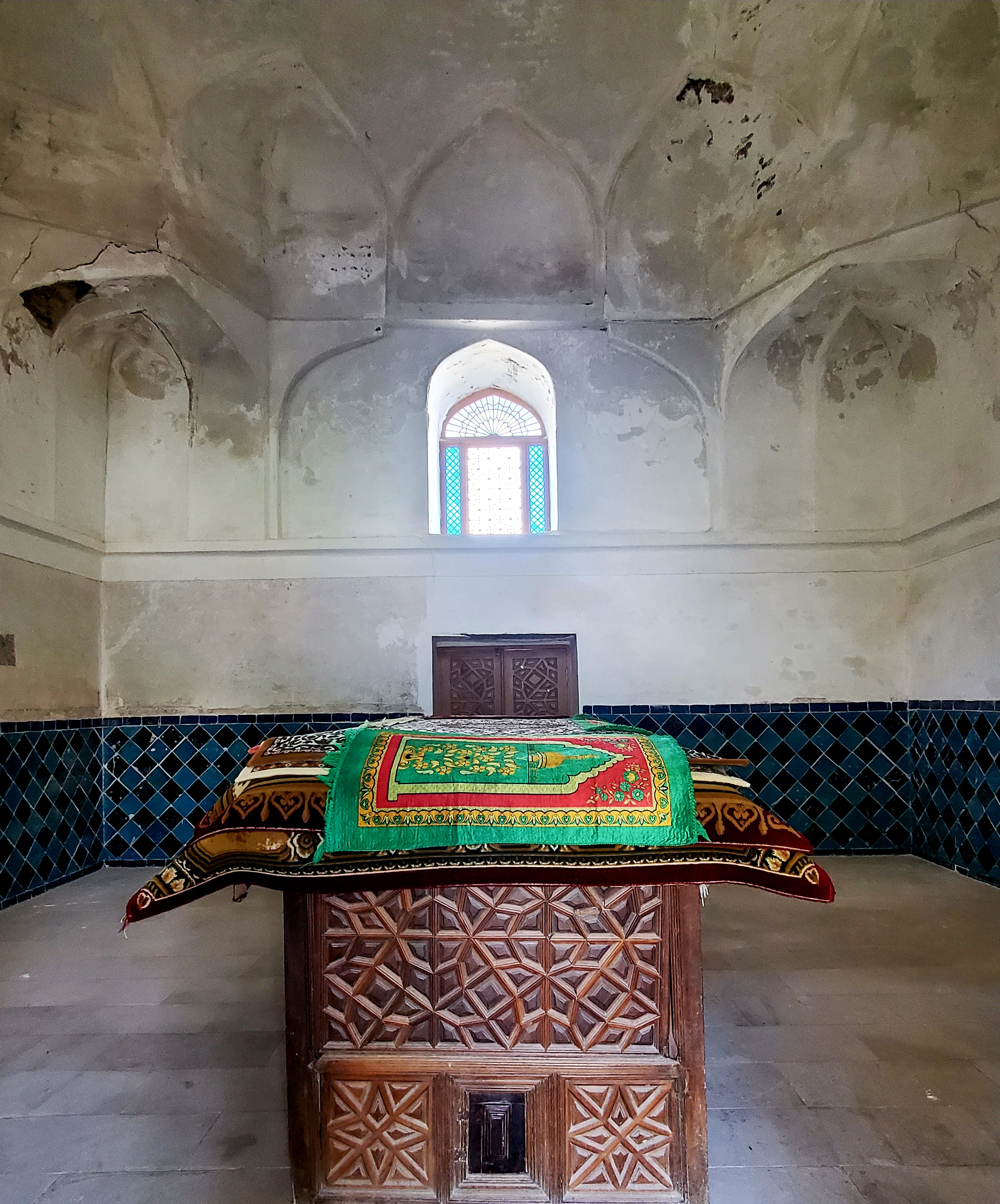

== See also ==
- Garabaghlar Mausoleum
- Melik Ajdar Mausoleum
- Yusif ibn Kuseyir Mausoleum
