= Hil mosque =

Mosque in Qusar, Azerbaijan

- Azerbaijani: Hil məscidi; Arabic: مسجد هيل (قوسار)
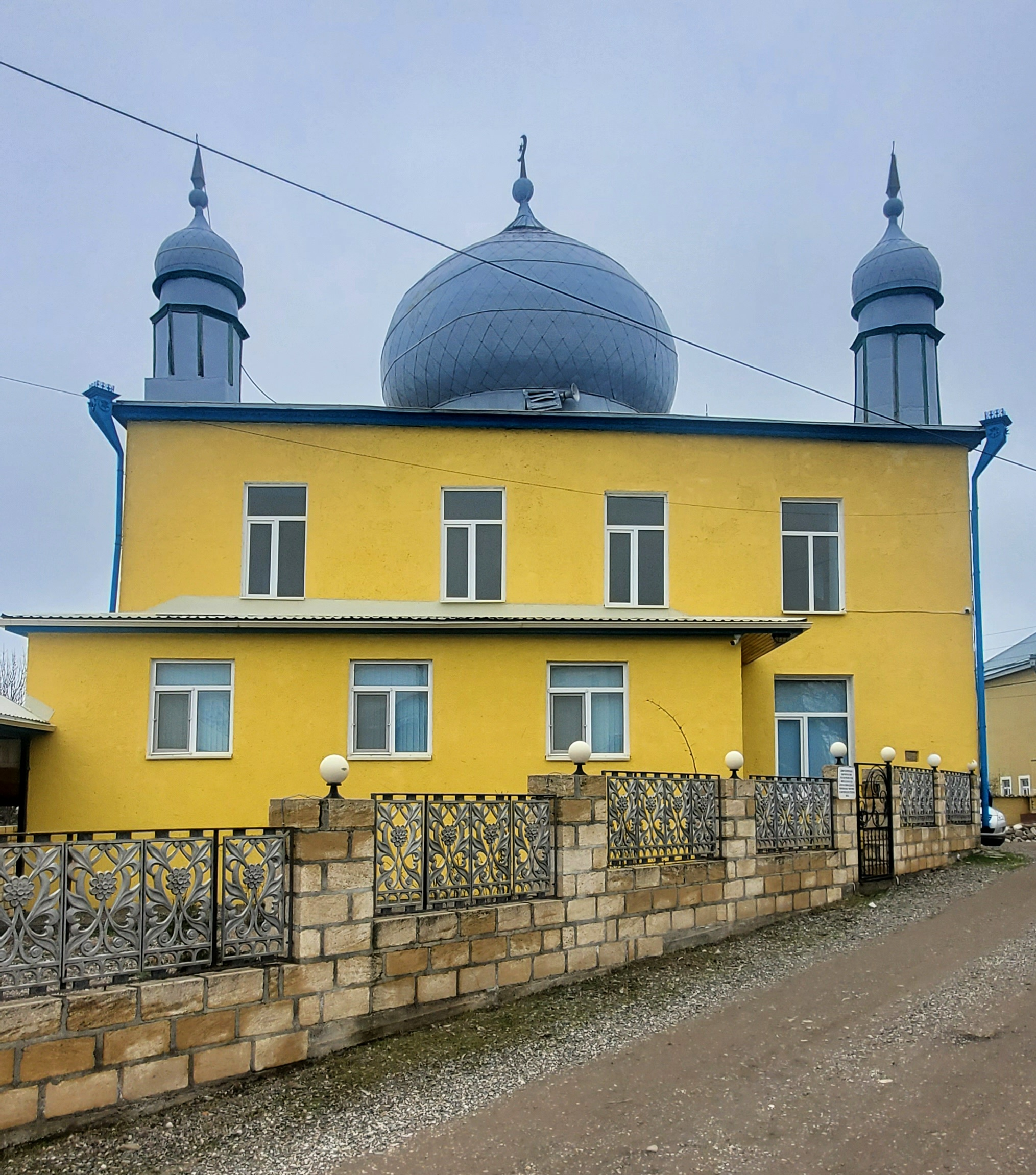
- The mosque in 2024

- Location of the mosque in Azerbaijan

Religion
- Affiliation: Islam
- Ecclesiastical or organisational status: Mosque (1912–1928); Profane use (1928–c. 1992); Mosque (since c. 1992)
- Status: Active

Location
- Location: Hil, Qusar
- Country: Azerbaijan
- Coordinates: 41°27′59″N 48°20′34″E

Architecture
- Type: Mosque architecture
- Style: Islamic
- Groundbreaking: 1908
- Completed: 1912

Specifications
- Capacity: 300 worshippers
- Dome: One
- Minaret: Four
- Minaret height: 4 m (13 ft)
- Materials: Stone; brick; iron

The Hil mosque (Azerbaijani: Hil məscidi; Arabic: مسجد هيل (قوسار)) is a mosque located in the village of Hil in the Qusar district of Azerbaijan.

Completed in 1912, the mosque was included in the list of immovable historical and cultural monuments of local importance by decision No. 132 of the Cabinet of Ministers of the Republic of Azerbaijan, dated August 2, 2001.

== History ==
The construction of the Hil village mosque began in 1908 with donations from the local villagers. The mosque was opened for worship in 1912.

After the Soviet occupation in Azerbaijan, an official campaign against religion began in 1928. In December of that year, the Central Committee of the Communist Party of Azerbaijan transferred many mosques, churches, and synagogues to clubs for educational purposes. While there were 3,000 mosques in Azerbaijan in 1917, this number decreased to 1,700 by 1927, 1,369 by 1928, and just 17 by 1933. The Hil Mosque was closed for worship during this period, and the building was used as a club and storage facility.

After Azerbaijan regained its independence, the mosque was reopened for worship. On August 2, 2001, the Cabinet of Ministers of the Republic of Azerbaijan included the mosque in the list of immovable historical and cultural monuments of local importance by decision No. 132.

== Architecture ==
River stones were used for the foundation, while the rest of the structure was built with sun-dried bricks. The interior was decorated with various ornaments. The roof was covered with iron sheets. In addition to the dome, four iron minarets were placed at the corners of the mosque, each 4 m (13 ft) in height. Inside the mosque, up to 300 people can pray together, and there is a large room on the second floor designated for women to worship.

In 2013, the mosque fell into a state of disrepair. Restoration efforts began in 2019. The exterior walls of the mosque were plastered, and its doors, windows, and roof were renovated.

== Gallery ==
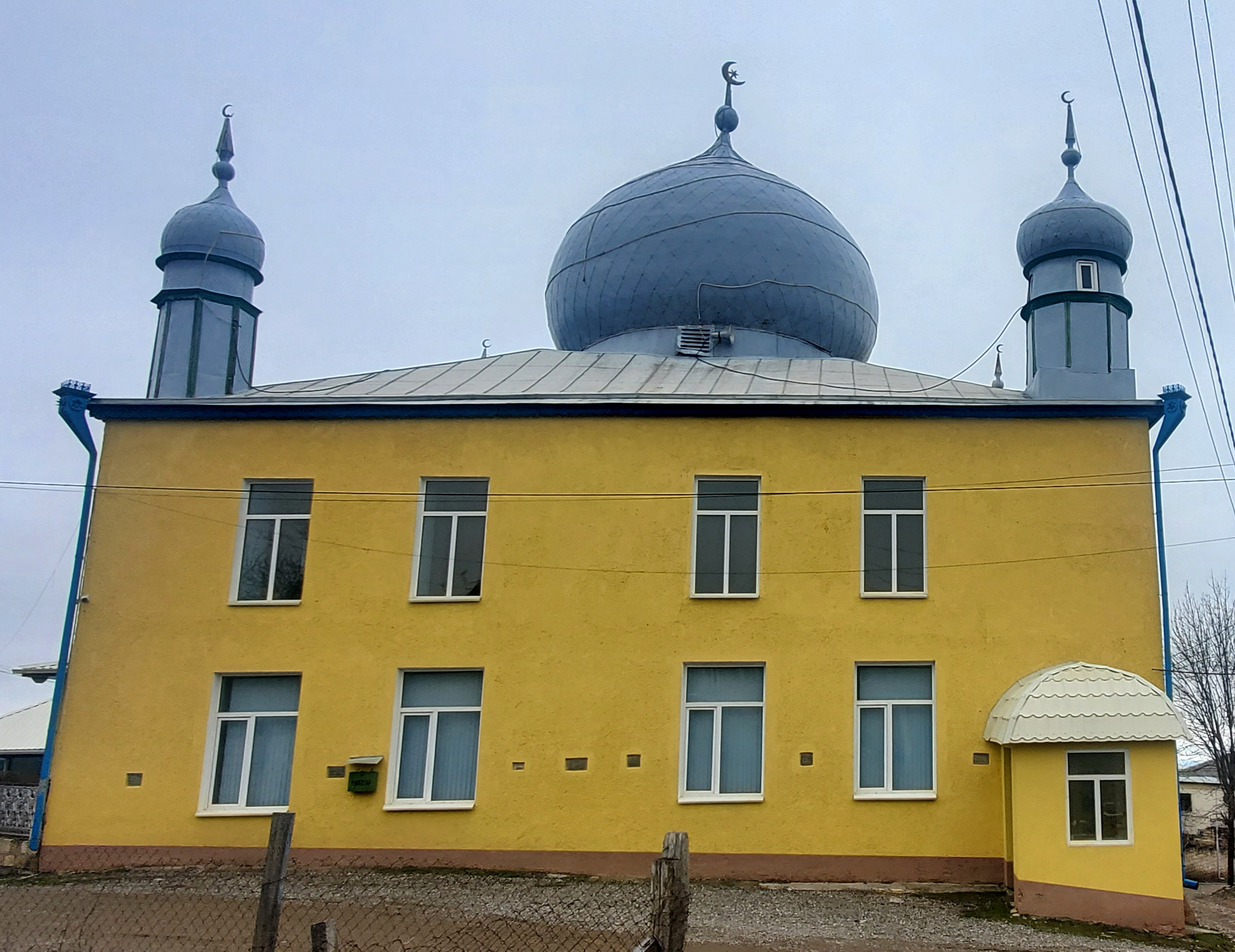

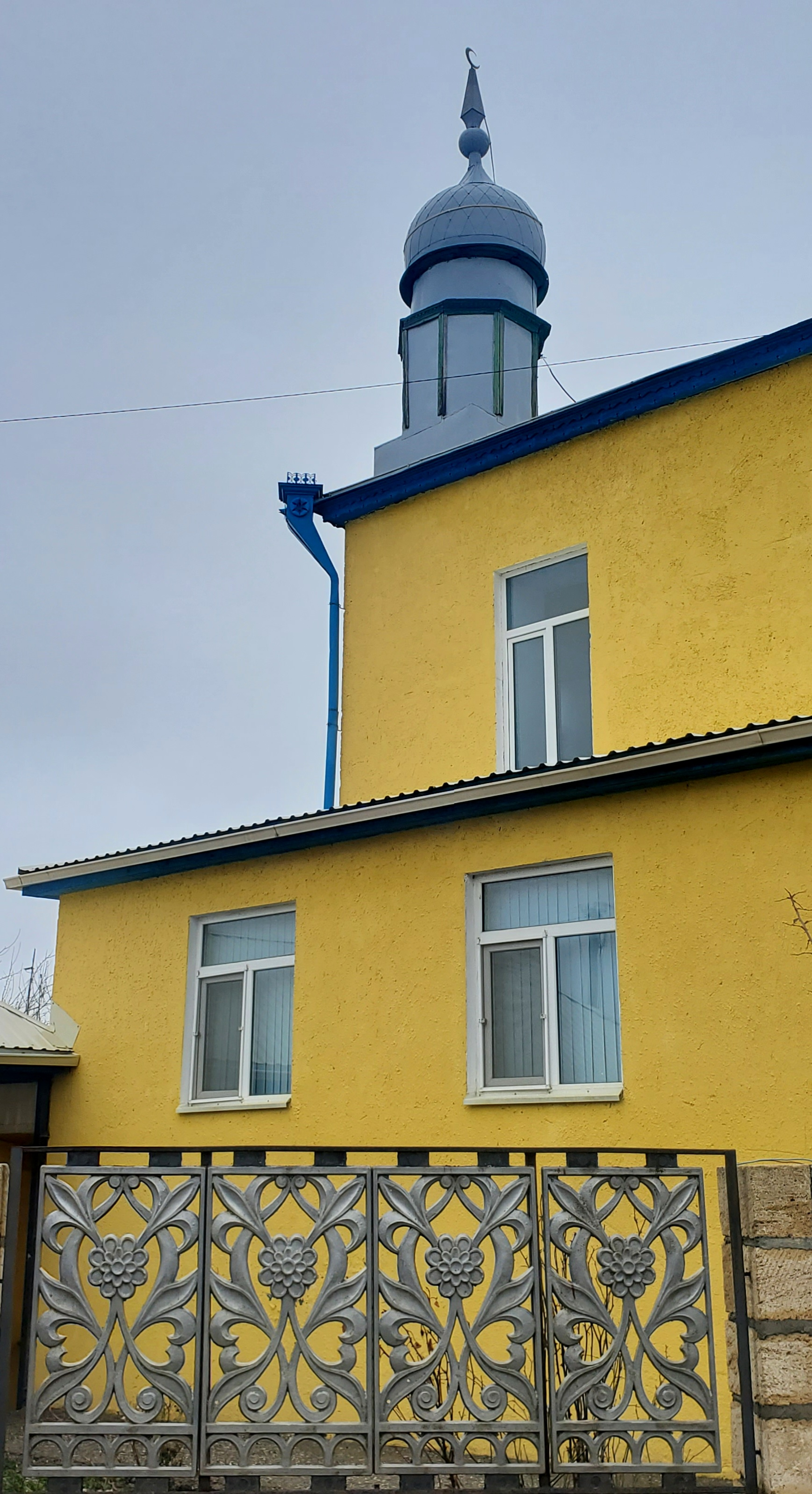

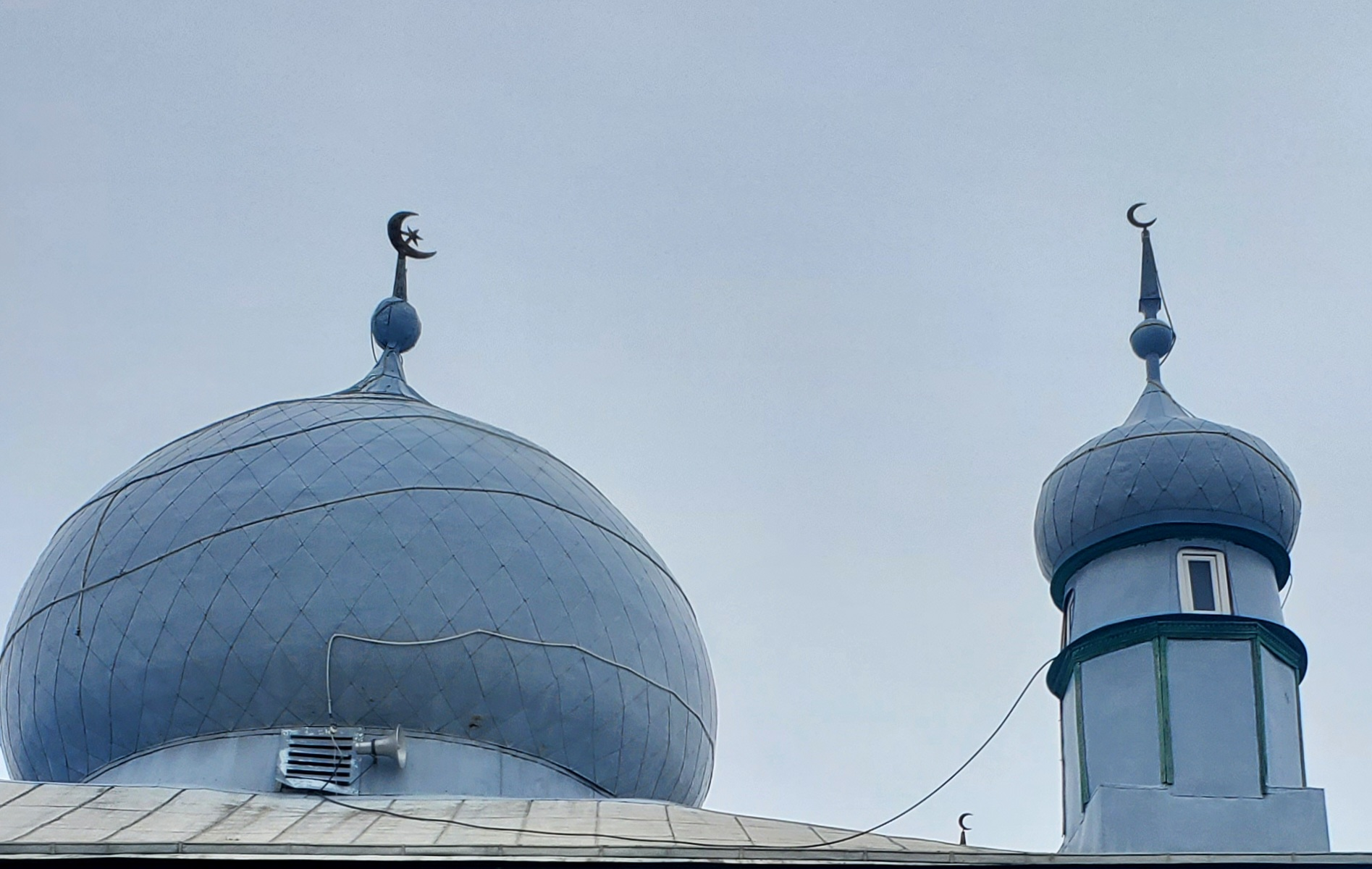

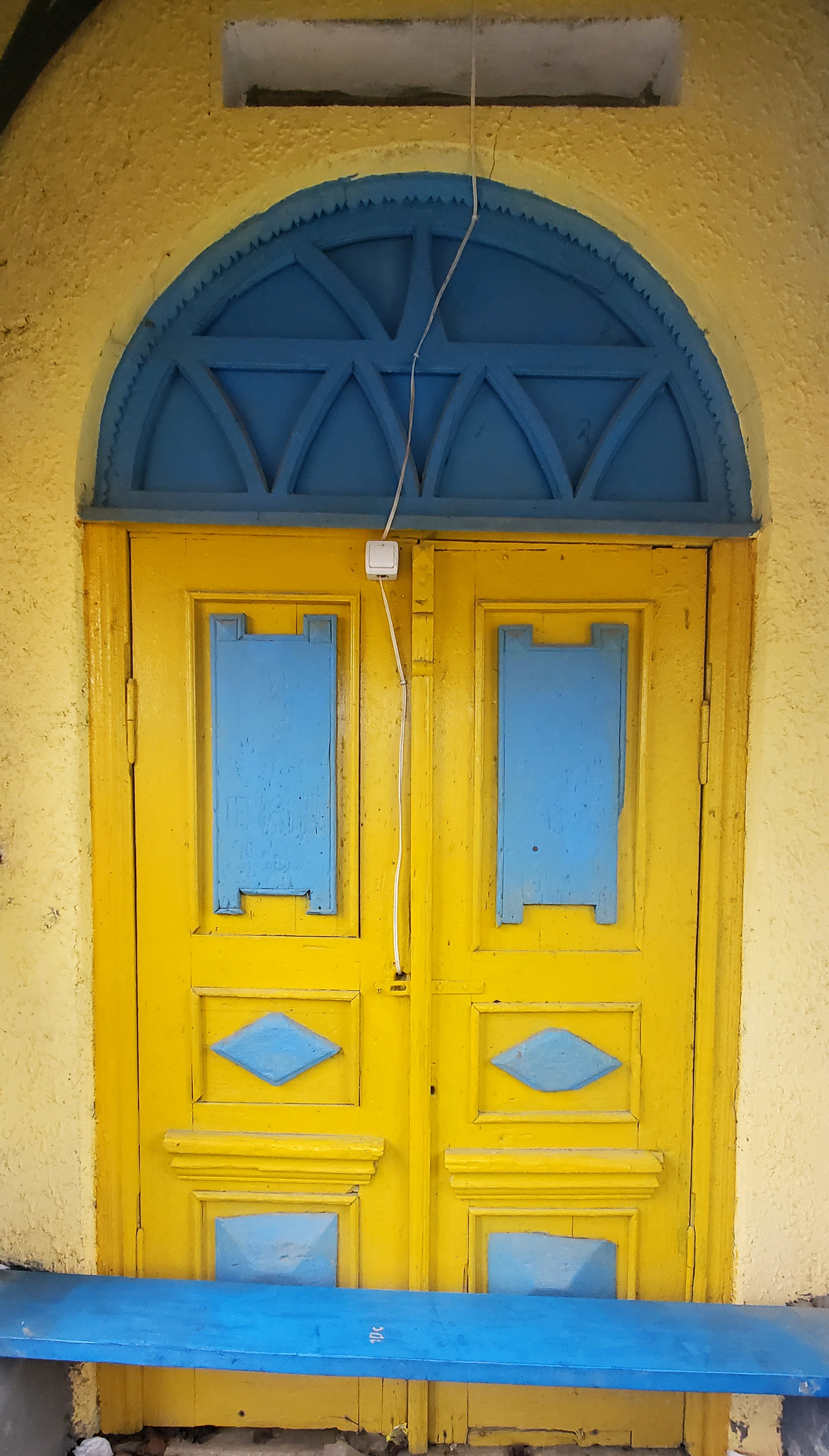

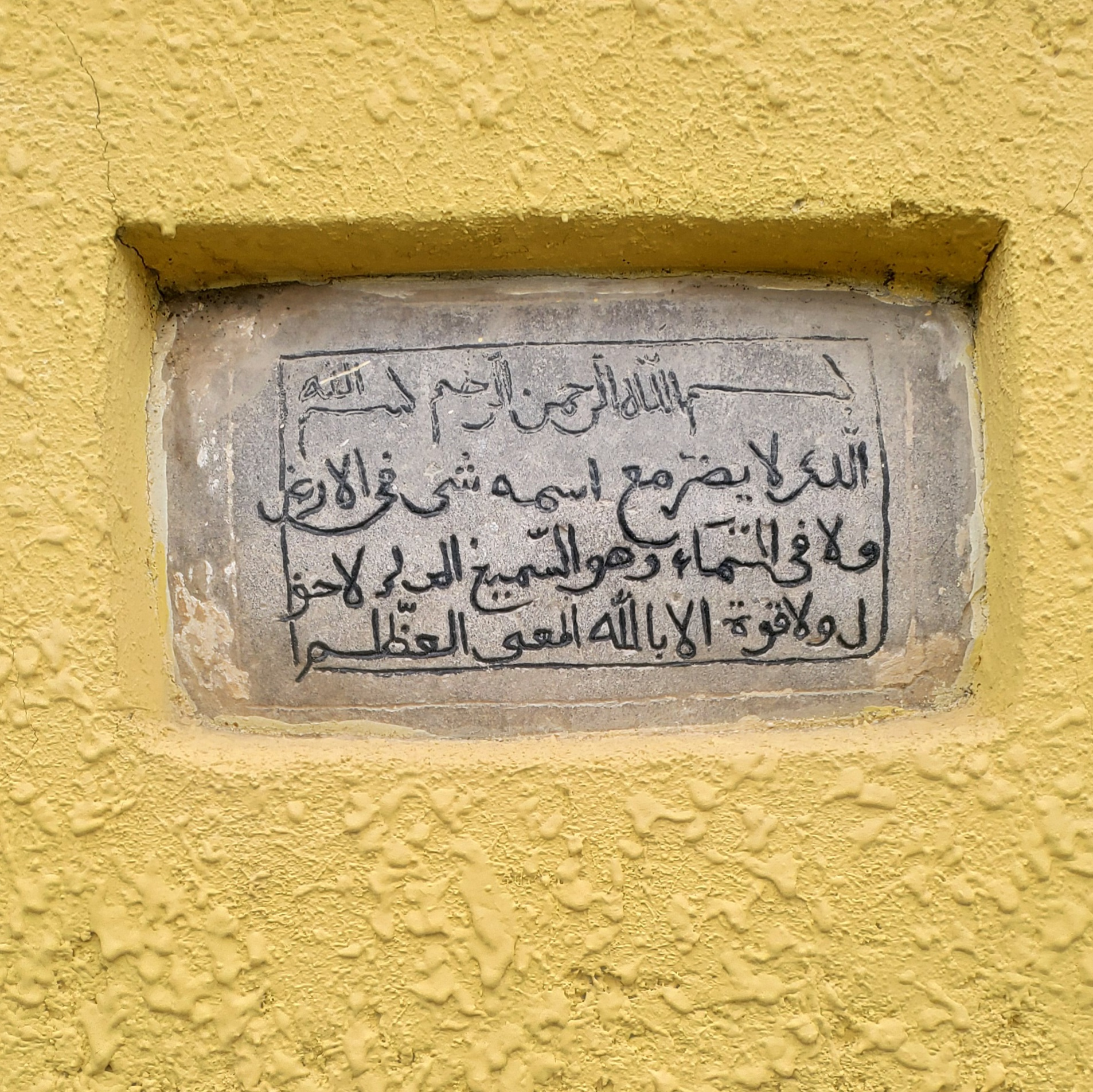

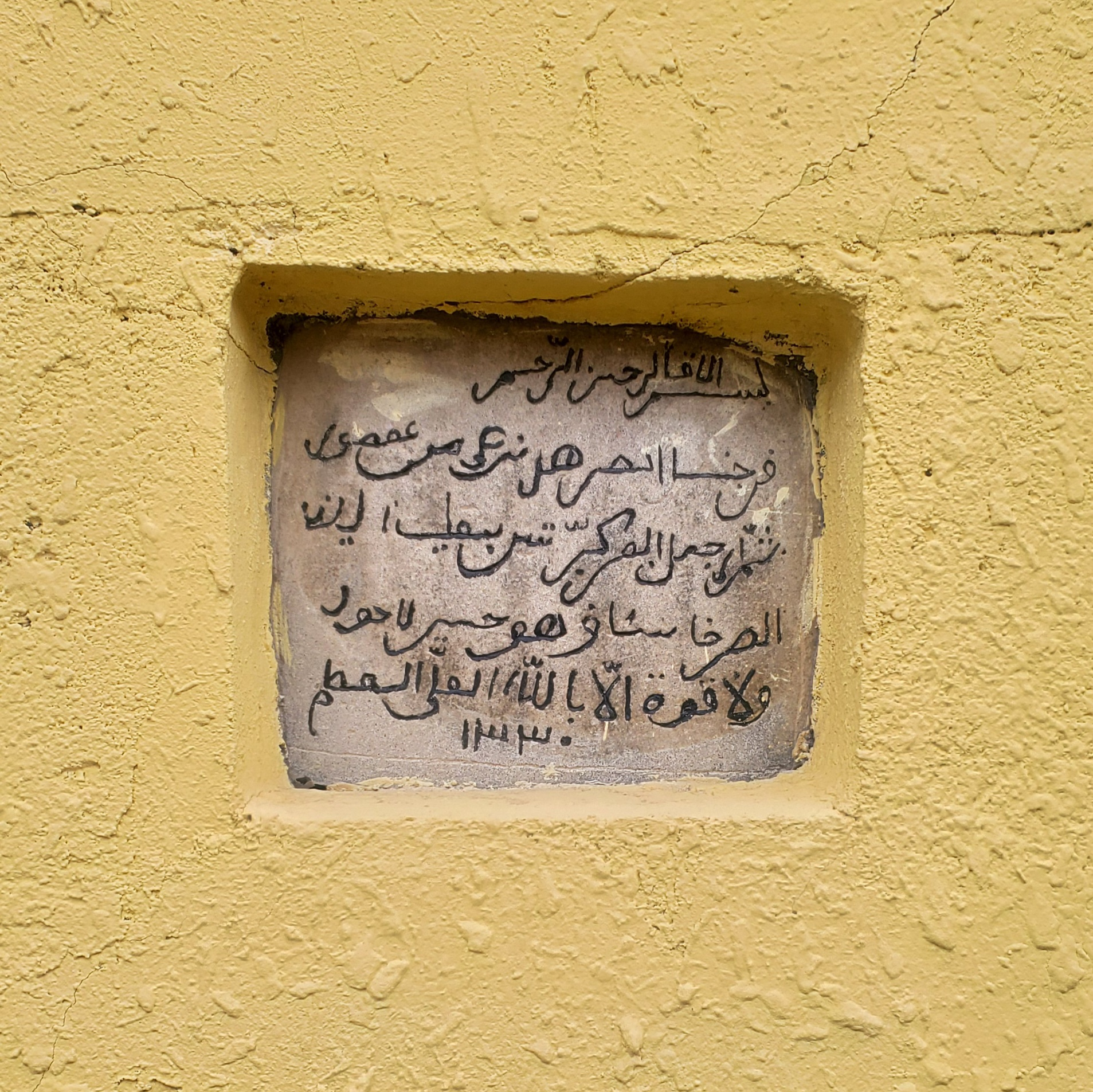
