= Kyraglydzhek =

- Location within Azerbaijan
- Coordinates: 41°30′N 48°38′E
- Country: Azerbaijan
- Rayon: Qusar
- Time zone: UTC+4 (AZT)

Kyraglydzhek (also known as Kyrakhly-Dzhek) is a village and municipality in the Qusar Rayon of Azerbaijan.

Kyraglydzhek is in the Azerbaijan Time (AZT) time zone.

The village is located across the Qudiyalçay River (or Kudyal River) from the larger town of Quba, Azerbaijan. It is the primary settlement of Azerbaijan's population of Highland Jews, who make up the population of approximately 4,000. It is possibly the only completely Jewish town outside Israel. The most widely spoken language in Qırmızı Qəsəbə is Juhuri.
