= Salahoba =

- Location within Azerbaijan
- Coordinates: 41°41′58″N 48°30′36″E
- Country: Azerbaijan
- Rayon: Qusar
- Municipality: Üzdənoba
- Time zone: UTC+4 (AZT)
  - Summer (DST): UTC+5 (AZT)

Salahoba (also, Salakhoba) is a village in the Qusar Rayon of Azerbaijan. The village forms part of the municipality of Üzdənoba.
