= Hiloba =

- Municipality
- Location within Azerbaijan
- Coordinates: 41°38′03″N 48°32′51″E
- Country: Azerbaijan
- Rayon: Qusar

Population
  - Total: 460
- Time zone: UTC+4 (AZT)
  - Summer (DST): UTC+5 (AZT)

Hiloba (also, Gil’, Gil’-Kish, and Gil’oba) is a village and municipality in the Qusar Rayon of Azerbaijan. It has a population of 460.
