= Suvacal =

- Municipality
- Location within Azerbaijan
- Coordinates: 41°20′44″N 48°15′00″E
- Country: Azerbaijan
- Rayon: Qusar

Population
  - Total: 670
- Time zone: UTC+4 (AZT)
  - Summer (DST): UTC+5 (AZT)

Suvacal (also, Suvadzhal) is a village and municipality in the Qusar Rayon of Azerbaijan. It has a population of 670.
