= Zindanmuruq =

- Municipality
- Location within Azerbaijan
- Coordinates: 41°19′53″N 48°11′36″E
- Country: Azerbaijan
- Rayon: Qusar

Population
  - Total: 705
- Time zone: UTC+4 (AZT)
  - Summer (DST): UTC+5 (AZT)

Zindanmuruq (also, Zindanmurug and Zindan-Muruq) is a village and municipality in the Qusar Rayon of Azerbaijan. It has a population of 705.
