= Hil, Azerbaijan =

Hil
- Municipality
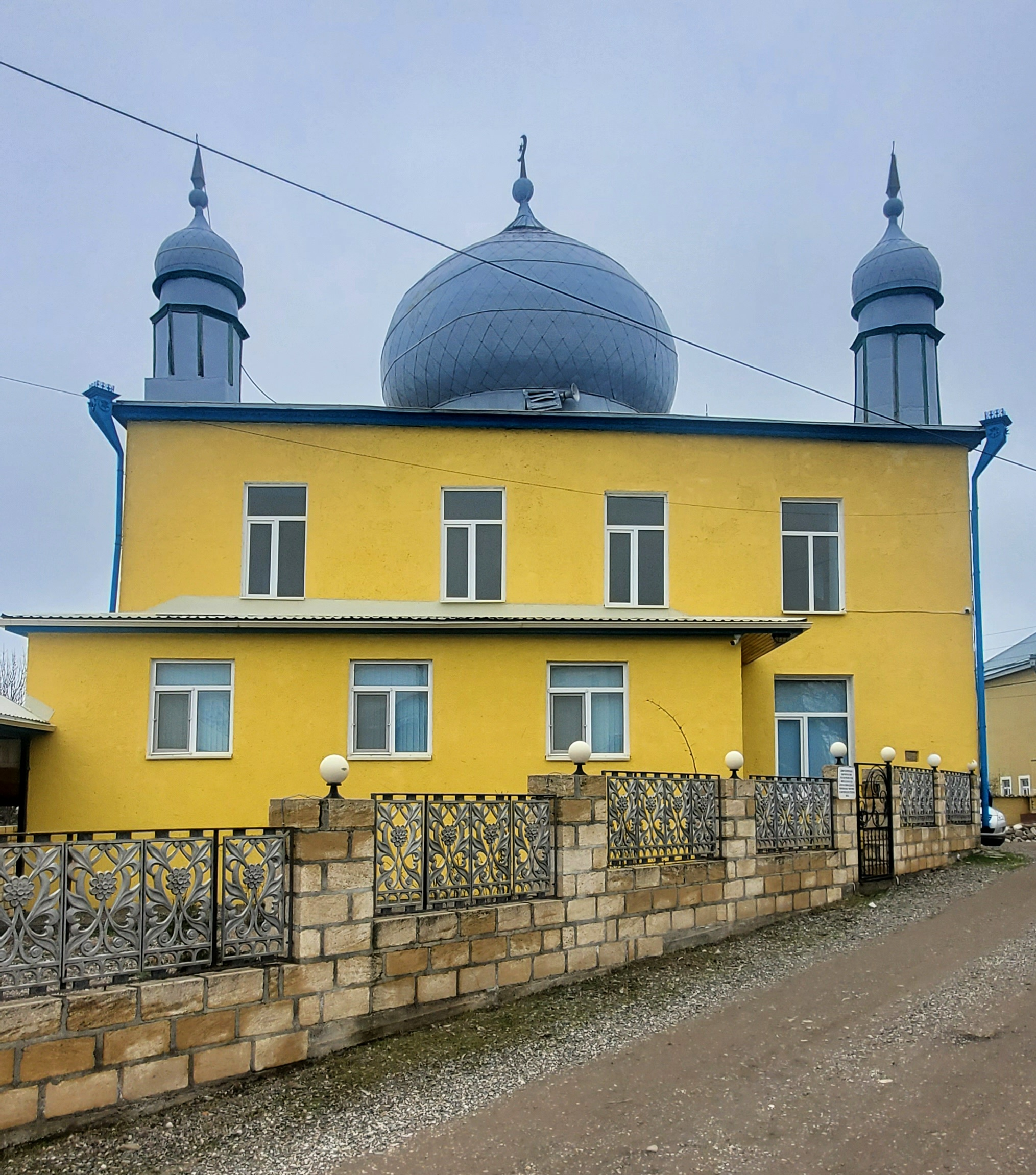
- Hil mosque

- Location within Azerbaijan
- Coordinates: 41°28′14″N 48°20′30″E
- Country: Azerbaijan
- Rayon: Qusar

Population
  - Total: 5,022
- Time zone: UTC+4 (AZT)
  - Summer (DST): UTC+5 (AZT)

Hil (also, Gil’, Lezgian: Гьил) is a village and the most populous municipality, except for the capital Qusar, in the Qusar Rayon of Azerbaijan. It has a population of 5,022. The village is mostly inhabited by Azerbaijans
