= Üzdənoba =

- Municipality
- Location within Azerbaijan
- Coordinates: 41°41′01″N 48°30′21″E
- Country: Azerbaijan
- Rayon: Qusar

Population
  - Total: 614
- Time zone: UTC+4 (AZT)
  - Summer (DST): UTC+5 (AZT)

Üzdənoba (also, Uzdenoba) is a village and municipality in the Qusar Rayon of Azerbaijan. It has a population of 614. The municipality consists of the villages of Üzdənoba and Salahoba.
