= Qullar, Qusar =

Gullar
- Municipality
- Azerbaijani: Qullar
- Location within Azerbaijan
- Coordinates: 41°38′18″N 48°28′30″E
- Country: Azerbaijan
- District: Qusar

Population
  - Total: 303
- Time zone: UTC+4 (AZT)
  - Summer (DST): UTC+5 (AZT)

Qullar (also spelt Gullar) is a village and municipality in the Qusar District of Azerbaijan. It has a population of 303.

== Population ==
According to the 2009 census, 313 people live in the village. According to the family census conducted in 1886, there were 174 people (92 men, 82 women) of Sunni Muslim Tatars (Azerbaijani) in 44 houses in the village of Gullar, which is part of the Baku governorate, Guba district, Gusar department, Zeykhur village society. According to the information on January 1, 1914, a total of 128 people of both sexes, mainly ethnic Tatars, lived in the village.
