= Mirza Valiyev =

Azerbaijani Red Army senior sergeant (1923–1944)

Mirza Dovlet oglu Valiyev
- Mirzə Dövlət oğlu Vəliyev
- Born: 1923; Yuxarı Ləgər, Azerbaijan SSR, Soviet Union
- Died: 6 November 1944 (aged 20–21); Vasad, Hungary
- Military career
- Allegiance: Soviet Union
- Branch: Red Army
- Service years: 1941–1944
- Rank: Senior sergeant
- Unit: 109th Guards Rifle Division
- Conflicts: World War II; Battle of the Caucasus; Dnieper-Carpathian Offensive; Belgrade Offensive; Budapest Offensive
- Awards: Hero of the Soviet Union; Order of Lenin; Order of Glory, 3rd class; Medal "For Courage"

Mirza Dovlet oglu Valiyev (Azerbaijani: Mirzə Dövlət oğlu Vəliyev; 1923 – 6 November 1944) was an Azerbaijani Red Army senior sergeant and a Hero of the Soviet Union. Valiyev was posthumously awarded the title for his actions in the Budapest Offensive. Commanding a 45mm anti-tank gun, he reportedly destroyed a number of German tanks after his crew was killed, and was himself killed. On 24 March 1945 Valiyev was posthumously awarded the title of Hero of the Soviet Union.

== Early life ==
Valiyev was born in 1923 in Yuxarı Ləgər in the Azerbaijan SSR to a peasant family. He received lower (incomplete) secondary education.

== World War II ==
Valiyev volunteered for the Red Army in June 1941. He became a 45mm anti-tank gunner. During his first battle, after his gun commander was killed, Valiyev reportedly took over the gun. He later became a senior sergeant and became a gun commander in the 3rd Rifle Battalion of the 309th Guards Rifle Regiment of the 109th Guards Rifle Division. Valiyev fought in the Battle of the Caucasus, the Dnieper–Carpathian Offensive, and the Belgrade Offensive. He was wounded four times during the war and received the Medal "For Courage". In 1944, he joined the Communist Party of the Soviet Union. On 11 October 1944 he was awarded the Order of Glory 3rd class for destroying one gun and two heavy machine guns blocking the advance of the infantry during the battles for Yasynovo on 2 October.

Valiyev fought in the Budapest Offensive in November 1944. On 6 November in Vasad a village southeast of Budapest, the rifle battalion supported by his gun crew was attacked by German infantry reportedly supported by twenty tanks. Valiyev's crew was killed or wounded. He reportedly destroyed while alone more than three tanks, an armored personnel carrier, and a troop-carrying vehicle. Valiyev reportedly continued to fire until he was killed. He was buried in Vasad at the site of the battle. For his actions, he was posthumously awarded the title Hero of the Soviet Union and the Order of Lenin on 24 March 1945.

Hero of the Soviet Union citation

In the battles for the Soviet homeland in the fight against the German-Fascist invaders he showed himself to be an exceptionally steadfast, courageous, decisive and selfless commander.

In the battles on the approaches to the city of Budapest, Hungary, in the area of the village of Vasad, on the line of the highway Monor-Üllő-Budapest the enemy, concentrating in this narrow sector the 13th Panzer Division, 4th Panzer Regiment and 682nd Grenadier Regiment of the Germans, under the support of massed artillery and mortar fire, covered from the air by aviation, went over to a decisive offensive, aspiring to encircle and destroy our advancing units and give themselves the opportunity to free the line of retreat of German units along the highway Monor-Üllő-Budapest highway, striking from the right flank with one desperate counterattack after another.

At 4:00 on 6 November 1944 the Germans with two reinforced battalions, supported by twenty tanks, began to counterattack the 3rd Rifle Battalion from the right flank. At this time, the gun of Senior Sergeant Veliyev barred the path of the advancing tanks of the enemy, shooting at point-blank range from an open firing position, at a range of 250 to 300 meters. In the first minutes of this battle the crew of the gun annihilated the lead tank. The remaining tanks of the enemy called down all their artillery and machine gun fire against the gun of the Guardsmen and the crew of the gun was put out of action. Guards Senior Sergeant Veliyev, remaining alone by the gun, continued the unequal fight with the approaching tanks of the enemy and in this annihilated three tanks, one armored vehicle, and one truck with infantry and ammunition.

The Germans, deciding to annihilate the gun of the hero at any price, rushed at him from three sides and with a direct shell hit the gun was destroyed and Veliyev himself died the death of the brave, embracing his gun.

As a result of this action the counterattack of the Germans misfired and, suffering heavy losses in personnel, equipment and weapons, they went back to their starting positions.

In this battle, Guards Senior Sergeant Mirza Davletovich Veliyev annihilated three tanks with their entire crews, one armored vehicle and one truck with infantry and ammunition, ensuing the repulse of the desperate tank counterattack of the Germans with heavy losses for them and himself died the death of a hero.

Deserving of the award - Hero of the Soviet Union posthumously.

A monument to Valiyev was created in Yuxarı Ləgər. A street in Qusar was named after him.
