= Həzrə, Qusar =

Həzrə
- Municipality
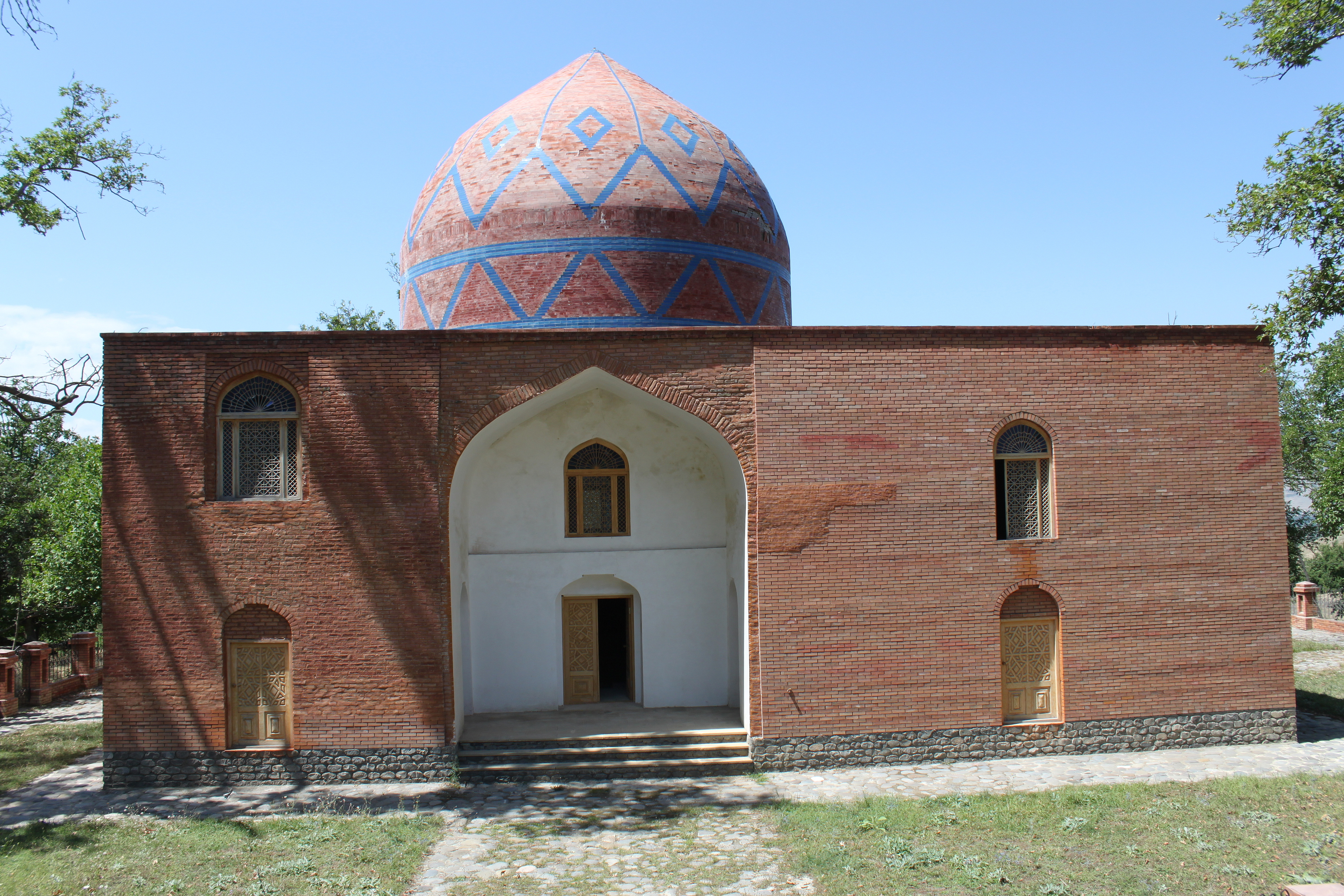
- The Mausoleum of Sheikh Juneid in the village of Khazra, Gusar region of Azerbaijan.

- Location within Azerbaijan
- Coordinates: 41°30′45″N 48°15′17″E
- Country: Azerbaijan
- Rayon: Qusar

Population
  - Total: 1,356
- Time zone: UTC+4 (AZT)
  - Summer (DST): UTC+5 (AZT)

Həzrə (also, Khazra and Khazry; Lezgian: Йаргу) is a village and municipality in the Qusar Rayon of Azerbaijan. It has a population of 1,356. The municipality consists of the villages of Həzrə and Həzrəoba.

Həzrə is located on the shores of the Samur River, which constitutes Azerbaijan's border with the Russian Federation. The Mausoleum of Sheikh Juneyd is also located in Həzrə.
