= Yuxarı Ləgər =

- Municipality
- Location within Azerbaijan
- Coordinates: 41°21′N 48°17′E
- Country: Azerbaijan
- Rayon: Qusar

Population
  - Total: 533
- Time zone: UTC+4 (AZT)
  - Summer (DST): UTC+5 (AZT)

Yuxarı Ləgər (also, Yukhary Leger) is a village and municipality in the Qusar Rayon of Azerbaijan. It has a population of 533.

== Notable natives ==
- Mirza Valiyev — Hero of the Soviet Union.
