= Həzrəoba, Qusar =

Həzrəoba is a small rural village in the municipality of Həzrə in the Qusar Rayon of Azerbaijan.
