= Çiləgir, Qusar =

Çiləgir
- Municipality
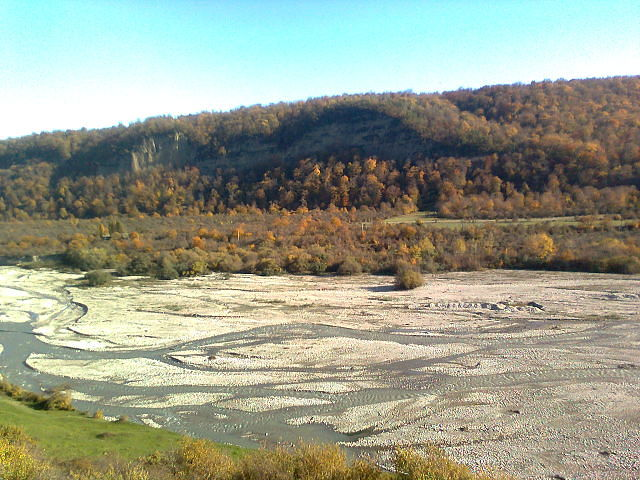

- Location within Azerbaijan
- Coordinates: 41°24′01″N 48°22′19″E
- Country: Azerbaijan
- Rayon: Qusar

Population
  - Total: 928
- Time zone: UTC+4 (AZT)
  - Summer (DST): UTC+5 (AZT)

Çiləgir (also, Chilegir and Chileir) is a village and municipality in the Qusar Rayon of Azerbaijan. It has a population of 928.
