= Vasad, Hungary =

Vasad
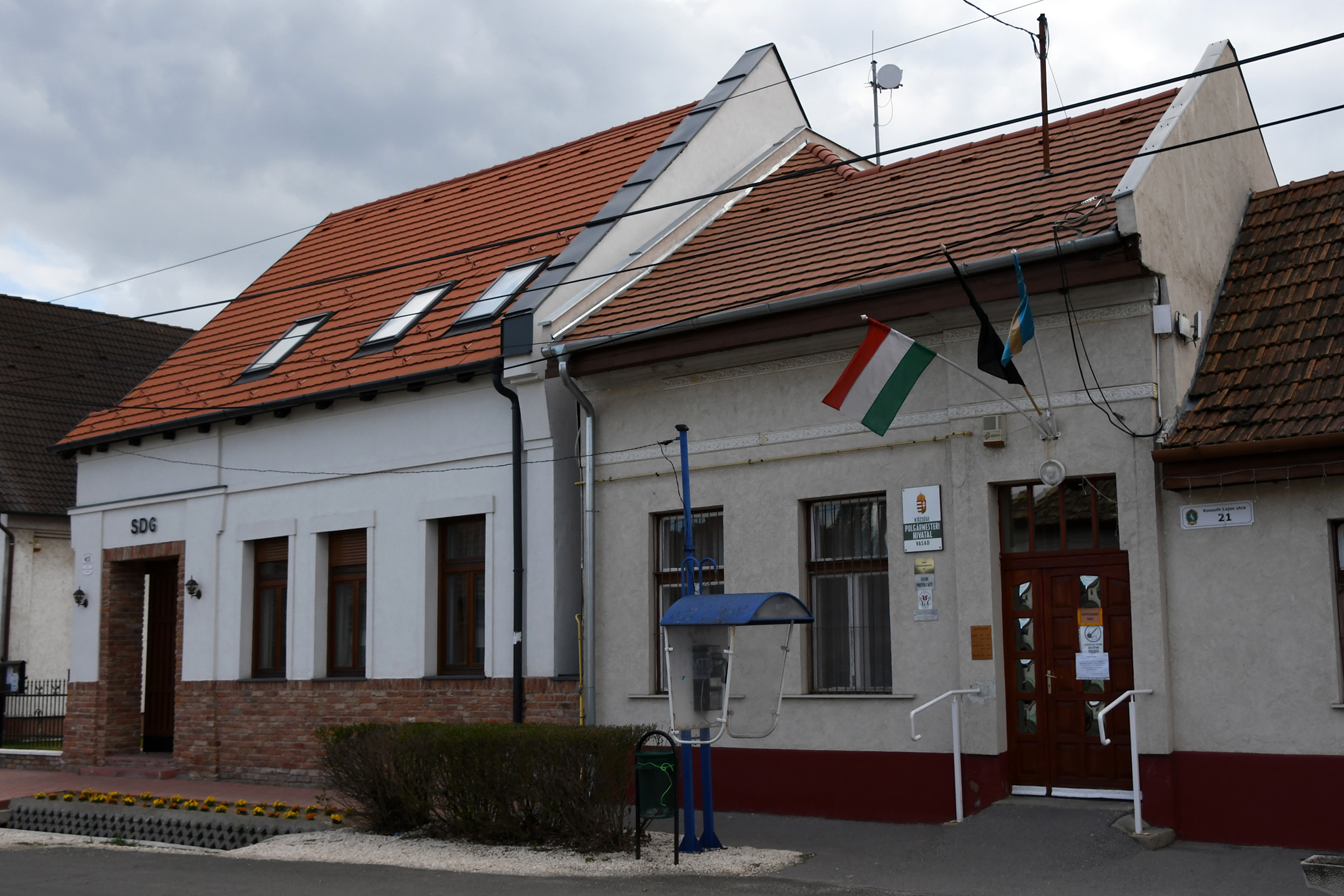
- Village hall

- Flag Coat of arms

- Location of Vasad in Hungary
- Coordinates: 47°19′N 19°24′E
- Country: Hungary
- Region: Central Hungary
- County: Pest
- District: Monor
- Rank: Village

Area
  - Total: 33.41 km^{2} (12.90 sq mi)

Population (1 January 2012)
  - Total: 1,899
  - Density: 56.84/km^{2} (147.2/sq mi)
- Time zone: UTC+1 (CET)
  - Summer (DST): UTC+2 (CEST)
- Postal code: 2211
- Area code: +36 29
- KSH code: 22585
- Website: www.vasad.asp.lgov.hu

Vasad is a village in Pest county, Hungary.
