= Kyzyl-Bulyak =

Kyzyl-Bulyak Кызыл-Буляк
- Village
- Location within Bashkortostan Location within Russia
- Coordinates: 54°34′N 53°35′E
- Country: Russia
- Region: Bashkortostan
- District: Tuymazinsky District
- Time zone: UTC+5:00

Kyzyl-Bulyak (Russian: Кызыл-Буляк; Bashkir: Ҡыҙылбүләк, Qıźılbüläk) is a rural locality (a village) in Starotuymazinsky Selsoviet, Tuymazinsky District, Bashkortostan, Russia. The population was 76 as of 2010. There are 4 streets.

== Geography ==
Kyzyl-Bulyak is located 11 km southwest of Tuymazy (the district's administrative centre) by road. Gorny is the nearest rural locality.
