= Düztahir =

- Municipality
- Location within Azerbaijan
- Coordinates: 41°24′22″N 48°09′13″E
- Country: Azerbaijan
- Rayon: Qusar

Population
  - Total: 1,555
- Time zone: UTC+4 (AZT)
  - Summer (DST): UTC+5 (AZT)

Düztahir (also, Dustair and Dyuztair) is a village and municipality in the Qusar Rayon of Azerbaijan. It has a population of 1,555.
