= Həzrəoba, Khachmaz =

Həzrəoba
- Location within Azerbaijan
- Coordinates: 41°41′29″N 48°34′48″E
- Country: Azerbaijan
- Rayon: Khachmaz
- Time zone: UTC+4 (AZT)
  - Summer (DST): UTC+5 (AZT)

Həzrəoba (also, Khazryoba and Khazvy) is a village in the Khachmaz Rayon of Azerbaijan.
