= Qusar District =

District in northeastern Azerbaijan

Coordinates: 41°25′N 48°26′E

- District
- Map of Azerbaijan showing Qusar District
- Country: Azerbaijan
- Region: Guba-Khachmaz
- Established: 8 August 1930
- Capital: Qusar
- Settlements: 90

Government
  - Governor: Shair Alkhasov

Area
  - Total: 1,500 km^{2} (580 sq mi)

Population (2020)
  - Total: 99,000
  - Density: 66/km^{2} (170/sq mi)
- Time zone: UTC+4 (AZT)
- Postal code: 3800
- Website: www.qusar-ih.gov.az

Qusar District (Gusar District; Azerbaijani: Qusar rayonu) is one of the 66 districts of Azerbaijan. It is located in the northeast of the country, in the Guba-Khachmaz Economic Region. The district borders the districts of Quba, Qabala, Khachmaz, and the Russian Republic of Dagestan. Its capital and largest city is Qusar. As of 2020, the district had a population of 99,000.

== Toponymy ==
According to the Oxford Concise Dictionary of World Place-Names, the word literally means "man" and derives from Lezgin kus.

There are several theories about the origin of the word "Qusar". One of them is that the word "qusar" comes from the Russian language, meaning "cavalry warrior". "Qusar" regiment was organized in this territory in 1783–1784. The district was probably named "Qusar" after the name of the regiment.

There is another theory that the word "qusar" derived from an ancient Turkish tribe called "qus/ quz" with the prefix "ar" meaning male.

Abbasgulu Bakikhanov used the word "qusar" in his book Golestan-i Iram to refer to a village.

== History ==
The earliest sediments in the district belong to the Jurassic Period, 135–145 million years old. It is estimated that life in the Qusar district has been existing since the 2nd millennium B.C. Mahmudtapa, the hills of Monsar, the Govdushan hills, the hills of Hafla belonging to the Bronze Age, the hills of Kyzylgul and Agahan, the Halakhur hills belonging to the Middle Ages are ancient dwellings dating back to the 1st millennium B.C.

=== Caucasian War ===
In 1837-1839, there were uprisings led by imam Muhammad Huluhvi luk and abrek Ali Hilivi in the territory of Kuba province and in the south of Dagestan.

The main reason for the uprising was the intensive displacement of the Lezgin population from Guba, Gusar and Khudat. The selected lands were given to Russian settlers and under military garrisons.

All Lezgin clans of the present-day Gusar district participated in the rebellion, with a total of about 12,000 rebels in the province; Lezgin clans from Southern Dagestan adjacent to the province also participated. By 1839, all pockets of rebel resistance had been suppressed.

The district was originated in 1930 and called Gil District with a centre in Hil village. In 1934, the centre of the district was moved to Qusar, and in 1938 it was renamed Qusar District.

Administrative structure:

- Qullar village
- Urva village

On 19 September 2024, the Islamic State attacked Azerbaijan in the Qusar District, killing 7 people and wounding 1 person.

== Geography ==
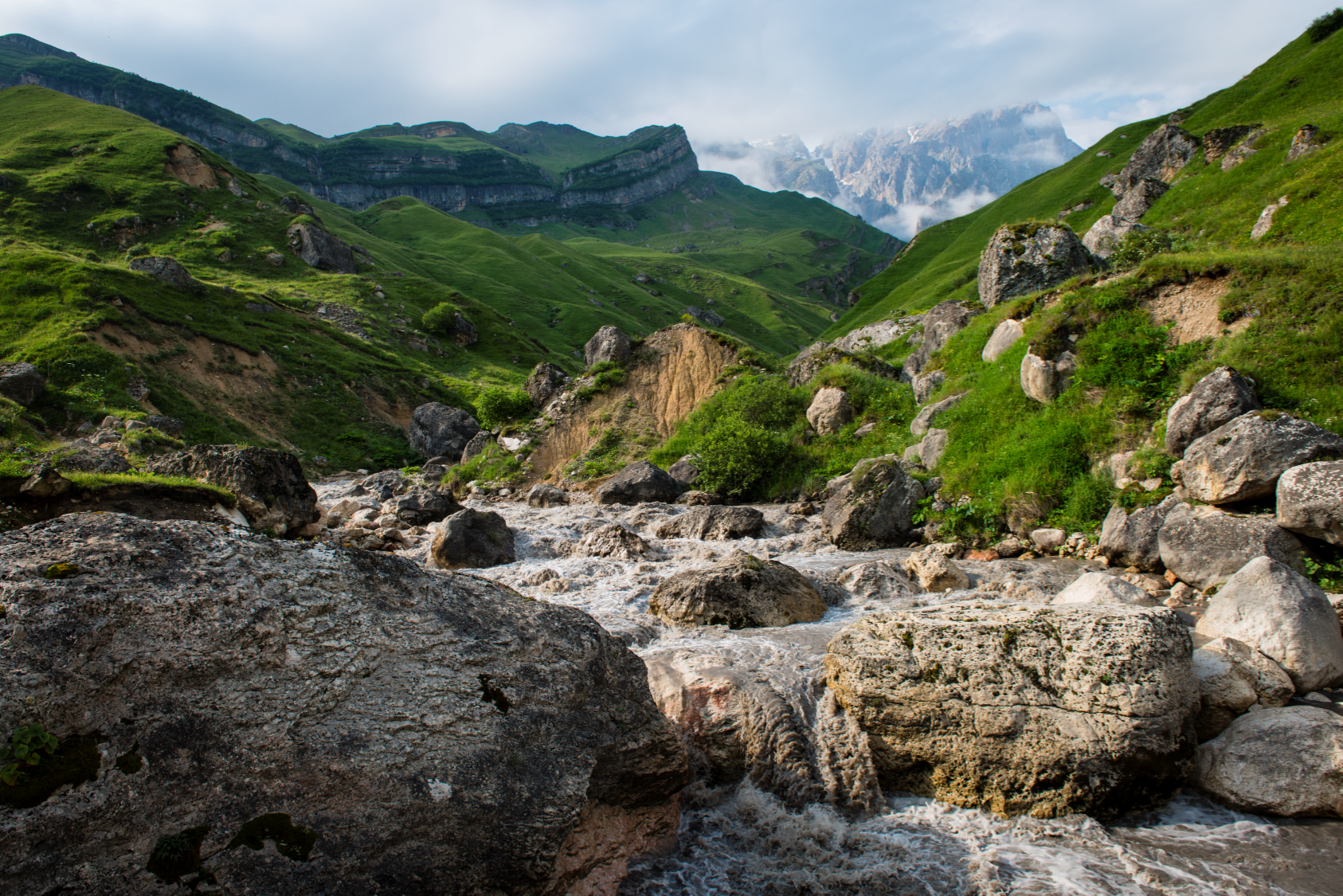
Shahdagh in the summer

Qusar is geographically located in Europe and is part of the Eurasian continent. It sits on the northeastern inclination of the main Caucasus Mountain ridge. It is located between 41°11’ – 41°45’ latitude North and 47°52’ – 48°41’ longitude East. Mountains, among which is also Shahdagh Mount, take the great part of the rayon. The territory of the rayon occupies the northeastern part of Azerbaijan. Qusar is a unique gate of the republic. Even in ancient times, the territory of the rayon took a good position on a junction of the main trade roads. It is 179 kilometres (111 mi) from Qusar to Baku, the capital of Azerbaijan.

The local relief within the Qusar district consists of mountains and valleys. Mineral sources such as limestone, chalcopyrite, limonite, and marble are common in the district. Qusar and Samur are main rivers of the Qusar District.

Qusar Rayon is located far from sea routes. The nearest seas to it are the Caspian Sea (15 km, 9.3 mi) and the Black Sea (550 km, 340 mi). The area of the rayon consists of 1,542 km^{2} (595 sq mi), occupying 1.7% of the area of Azerbaijan. Qusar is the 14th largest rayon in Azerbaijan. The Qusar rayon spans 84 km (52 mi) east-west, by 35 km (22 mi) north-south.

Extreme points of the district are:

- In North – Suduroba
- In South – Tufan dagh
- In East – Guzun gishlag
- In West – Bazarduzu summit

Length of the district's borders is 225 kilometres (140 mi). Extension of the borders in kilometres:

1. Dagestan Republic (with Akhtin, Dokuzpara and Mahammadkend rayons) 95 km (59 mi).
2. Qabala District 25 km (16 mi).
3. Quba District 70 km (43 mi).
4. Khachmaz District 65 km (40 mi).

=== Flora and fauna ===
Oak, peanut and hornbeam are often found in the forest areas. Natural herbs such as cranberry, sumac, hawthorn, wild grapes and blackberries are also grown in the forests.

Wolf, fox, bear, boar, mountain goat and rabbit are particular for forests of the district. There are wild pigeons, quails, green ducks and partridge birds in the fields and lakes.

On the territory of the district, Qusar State Nature Sanctuary was established according to the resolution of the Council of Ministers of Azerbaijan SSR dated February 24, 1964, on an area of 15,000 hectares with the purpose of preserving and increasing the number of animals and birds (pheasant, quail, roe, wild boar, rabbit) inhabiting here.

== Population ==
According to data of 2007, the population of the rayon consists of 85899 people; 90.63% are Lezgins and 9.06% are the Azerbaijanis. According to the data of 2009, Lezgins are 90.5%, Azerbaijanis are 9.1%, and other nationalities comprise 0.4%. As of 2016, the population of the rayon grew to 96,199 people. Lezgins constituted 2% of the total population of Azerbaijan in 2009 who commonly settled in Qusar district. National composition was indicated below in accordance with statistics in 2009.

Ethnic groups in Qusar (2019)
1. Lezgins (86.5%)
2. Azerbaijanis (13.2%)
3. Others (0.38%)

The urban population in 2017 accounted for 21%, and 79% of the district's population lives in the village.

According to the State Statistics Committee, as of 2018, the population of city recorded 97,200 persons, which increased by 15,400 persons (about 18.8 percent) from 81,800 persons in 2000. Of the total population, 48,600 are men and 48,600 are women. More than 26,9 percent of the population (about 26,200 persons) consists of young people and teenagers aged 14–29.

The population of the district by the year (at the beginning of the year, thousand persons)
| Region | 2000 | 2001 | 2002 | 2003 | 2004 | 2005 | 2006 | 2007 | 2008 | 2009 | 2010 | 2011 | 2012 | 2013 | 2014 | 2015 | 2016 | 2017 | 2018 | 2019 | 2020 | 2021 |
|---|---|---|---|---|---|---|---|---|---|---|---|---|---|---|---|---|---|---|---|---|---|---|
| Gusar region | 81,8 | 82,6 | 83,2 | 83,7 | 84,2 | 84,9 | 85,7 | 86,4 | 87,2 | 87,7 | 88,4 | 89,3 | 90,5 | 91,5 | 92,6 | 93,8 | 95,1 | 96,2 | 97,2 | 98,1 | 99,0 | 99,7 |
| urban population | 17,6 | 17,7 | 17,8 | 17,8 | 17,9 | 18,0 | 18,1 | 18,3 | 18,4 | 18,5 | 18,6 | 18,9 | 19,5 | 19,7 | 19,8 | 20,1 | 20,3 | 20,4 | 20,6 | 20,7 | 20,9 | 21,0 |
| rural population | 64,2 | 64,9 | 65,4 | 65,9 | 66,3 | 66,9 | 67,6 | 68,1 | 68,8 | 69,2 | 69,8 | 70,4 | 71,0 | 71,8 | 72,8 | 73,7 | 74,8 | 75,8 | 76,6 | 77,4 | 78,1 | 78,7 |

== Religion ==
- Muslims 98%

== Sports and tourism ==
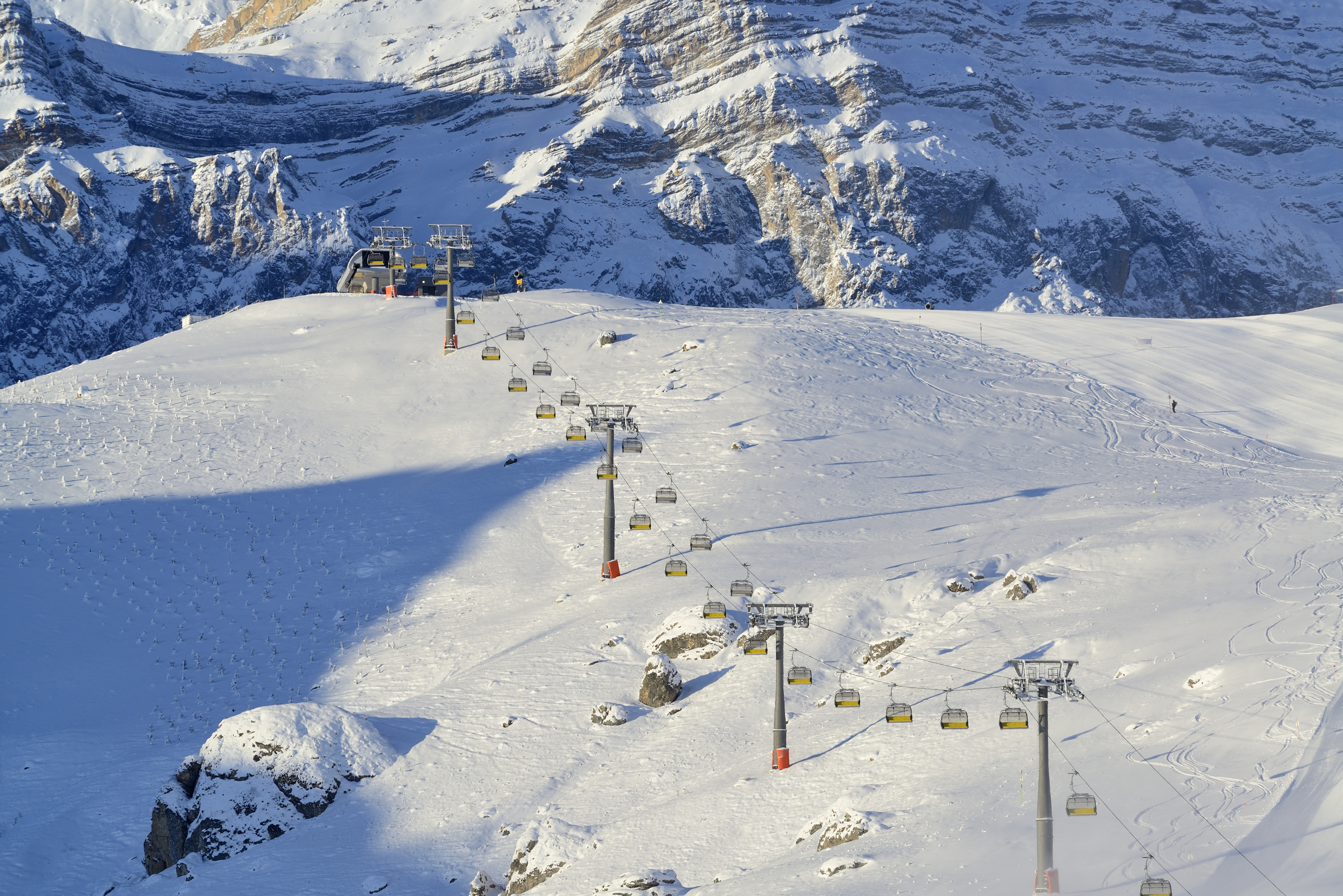
Ski Lift in Shahdag

Qusar is home to Shahdag Mountain Resort, one of the biggest ski resorts in the Caucasus and Azerbaijan's first and largest winter resort. Tourist facilities also include such recreational areas as "Alpine Gusar", "Star Gusar", "Gayi Bulak", mountain tourism recreation area, and the Olympic Sports Complex.

=== Sightseeing ===
There are 2 architectural and 46 archaeological monuments in Qusar. The remains of the 13th century fortress in the village of Anigh, the Shaykh Junayd Mausoleum built in 1544 in the village of Hazra (Yargun), are protected by the government as significant architectural monuments of the country. There are also Kohne Khudat and Huray mosques, belonging to the 18th century, Gil, Gyunduzgala and Hasangala mosques, belonging to the 19th century. There is a museum named after Russian poet Mikhail Lermontov.

== Education ==
There are 48 secondary schools, 86 general-education schools, 4 non-formal schools, and 13 pre-school education facilities.

In addition, 3 large sports facilities are functioning in the Gusar district: the Olympic Sports Complex, Central Stadium named after Shovkat Ordukhanov, Children and Youth Sports School.

== Economy ==
Agriculture is a basis of the region's economy. Sown area comprises 34,403 hectares (85,010 acres) (42.2%) of the 81,460 ha (201,300 acres) of land suitable for agriculture. The area of irrigated lands is 29,398 ha (72,640 acres). Agriculture of this region is based on two main fields – crop production and animal husbandry.

Wheat, barley, corn, beans, potatoes, apples, pears, nuts, tomatoes, and cabbage are the main crops grown in Qusar. There are more than 5000 hectares of fruit gardens. Nearly 68% of these gardens constitute apple gardens. In order to keep the fruits, cold storage rooms in Chubuglu village (capacity of 4000 tons), Samur settlement (800 tons), and Yeni Hayat village (2000 tons) were built with governmental support.

== Health care ==
There are 3 hospital establishments, 19 health posts, 38 medical centers, and 61 medical institutions in the Qusar district.

== Honorable residents ==
Heroes of the Soviet Union:

- Mirza Valiyev
- Adil Guliyev

== Administrative structure ==
There is 1 city (Qusar), 1 settlement (Samur) and 88 villages in the district which has a territory of 1542 km^{2}. Some of the villages are Anig, Chilegir, Duztahir, Gyunduzkala, Hiloba, Laza, New Tahirjal, Suvadzhal, Urva, Uzdenoba, Yukhary Leger, and Zindanmurug.

The current head of the raion's executive power is Shair Alkhanov since 2007. Under the head of the executive authority, there is acted Council consisted of thirteen members. Villages are controlled by overall 29 municipalities.
