= Azerbaijan–Russia border =

International border

Coordinates: 41.9000°N 46.4014°E

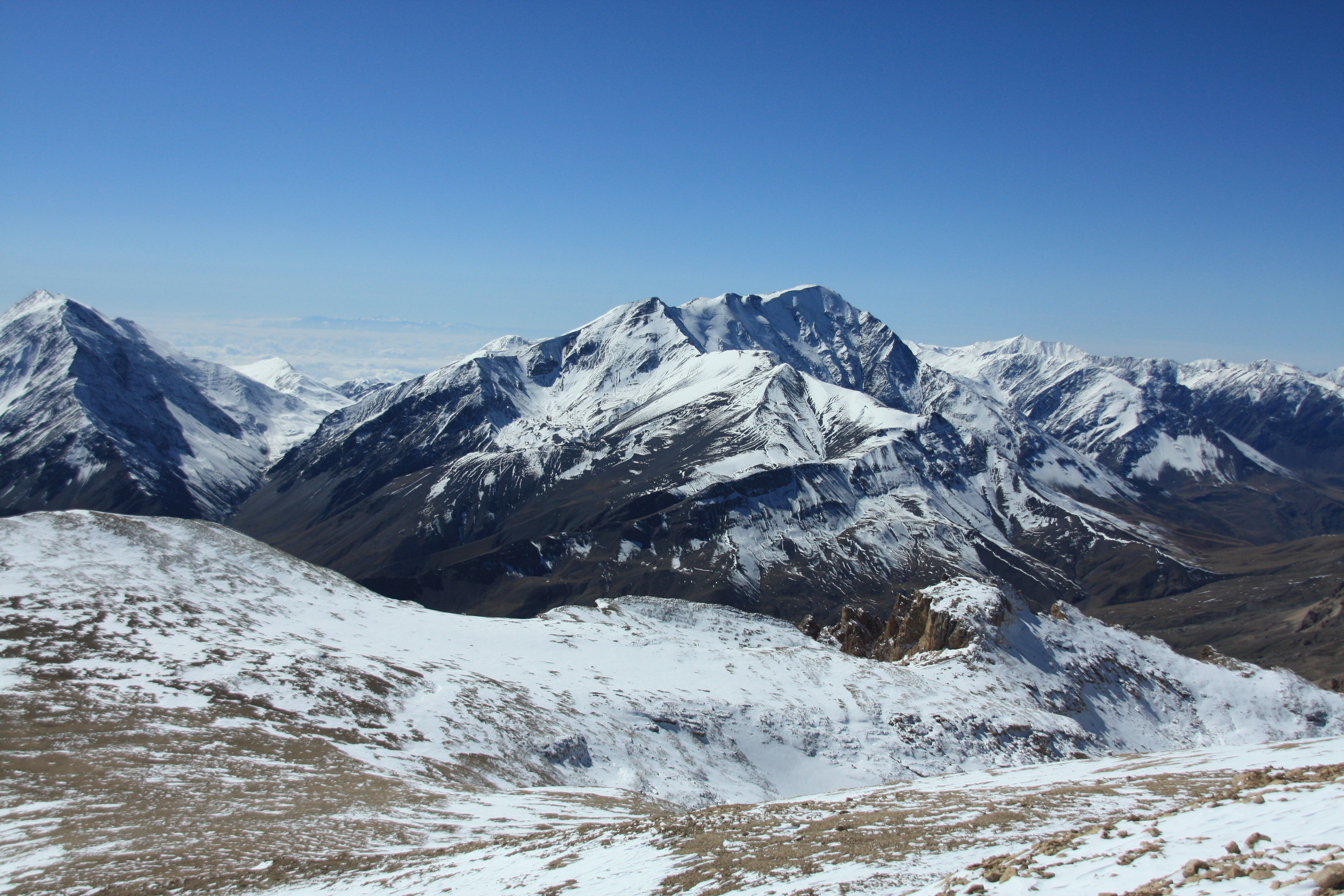

Characteristics
- Entities: Azerbaijan; Russia
- Length: 350 km

History
- Established: 1918; Transcaucasian Democratic Federative Republic
- Current shape: 1991 dissolution of the Soviet Union

Azerbaijani and Russian boundary markers

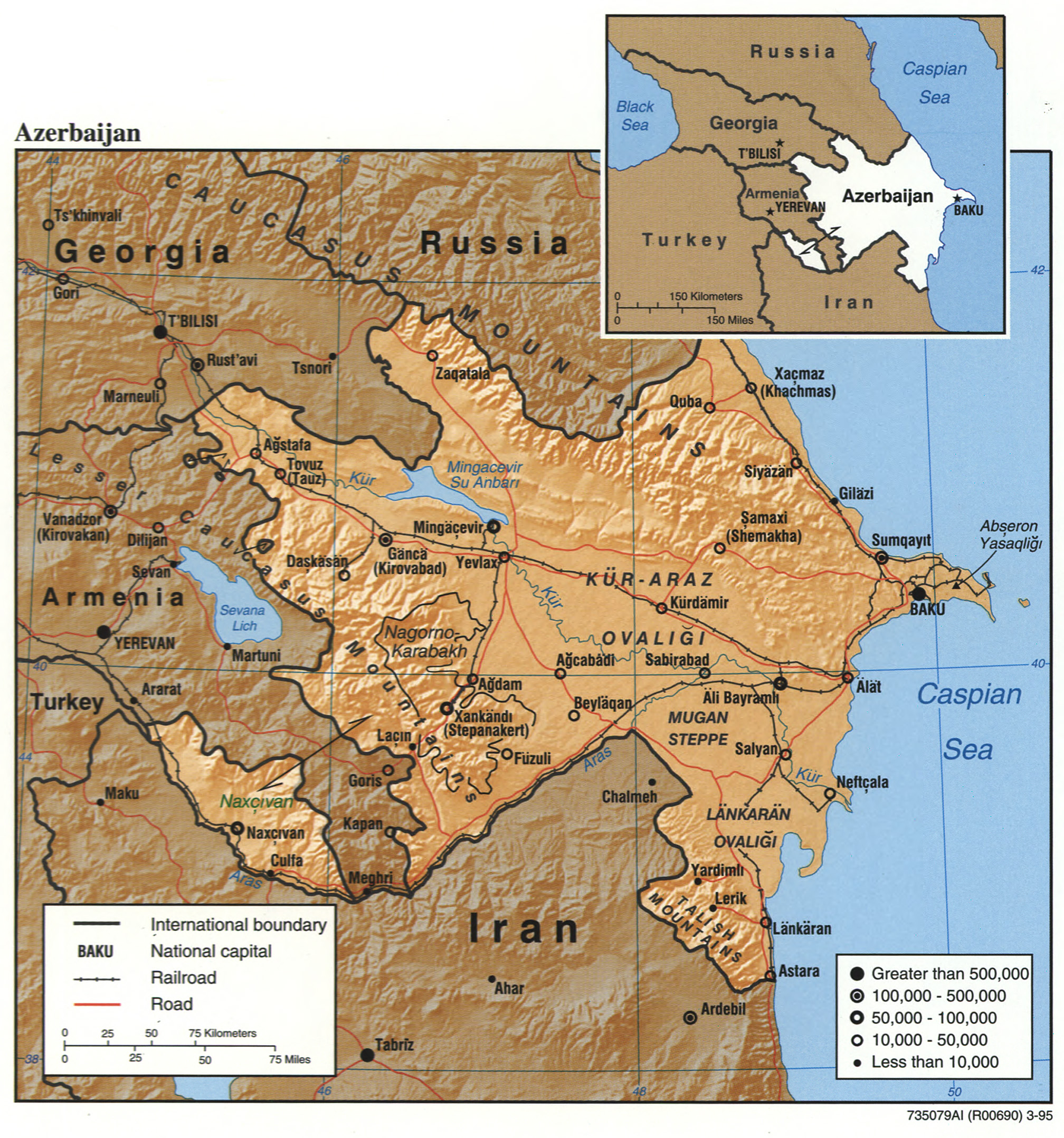
Map of Azerbaijan, with Russia to the north-east

Azerbaijan–Russia border (Azerbaijani: Azərbaycan–Rusiya sərhədi, Russian: Граница Азербайджана и России, romanized: Granitsa Azerbaydzhana i Rossii) is the international border between Russia and Azerbaijan. It is 338 km (210 mi) in length and runs from the tripoint with Georgia in the west to the Caspian Sea the east. Prior to 1991 it formed the border between the Russian Soviet Federative Socialist Republic (including Dagestan ASSR) and the Azerbaijan SSR within the Soviet Union. The southernmost point of the Russian Federation is located on the border.

== Description ==
The border starts in the west at the Georgian tripoint and proceeds in south-eastwards direction over various mountain ridges of the Caucasus Mountains, before turning to the north-east roughly halfway and then proceeding along the Samur river valley to the Samur Delta on the Caspian Sea coast. Mount Bazardüzü, the highest peak in both Dagestan and Azerbaijan, lies on the frontier. Parts of the border are fenced and equipped with technical facilities including barbed wire, sensors and cameras.

== History ==
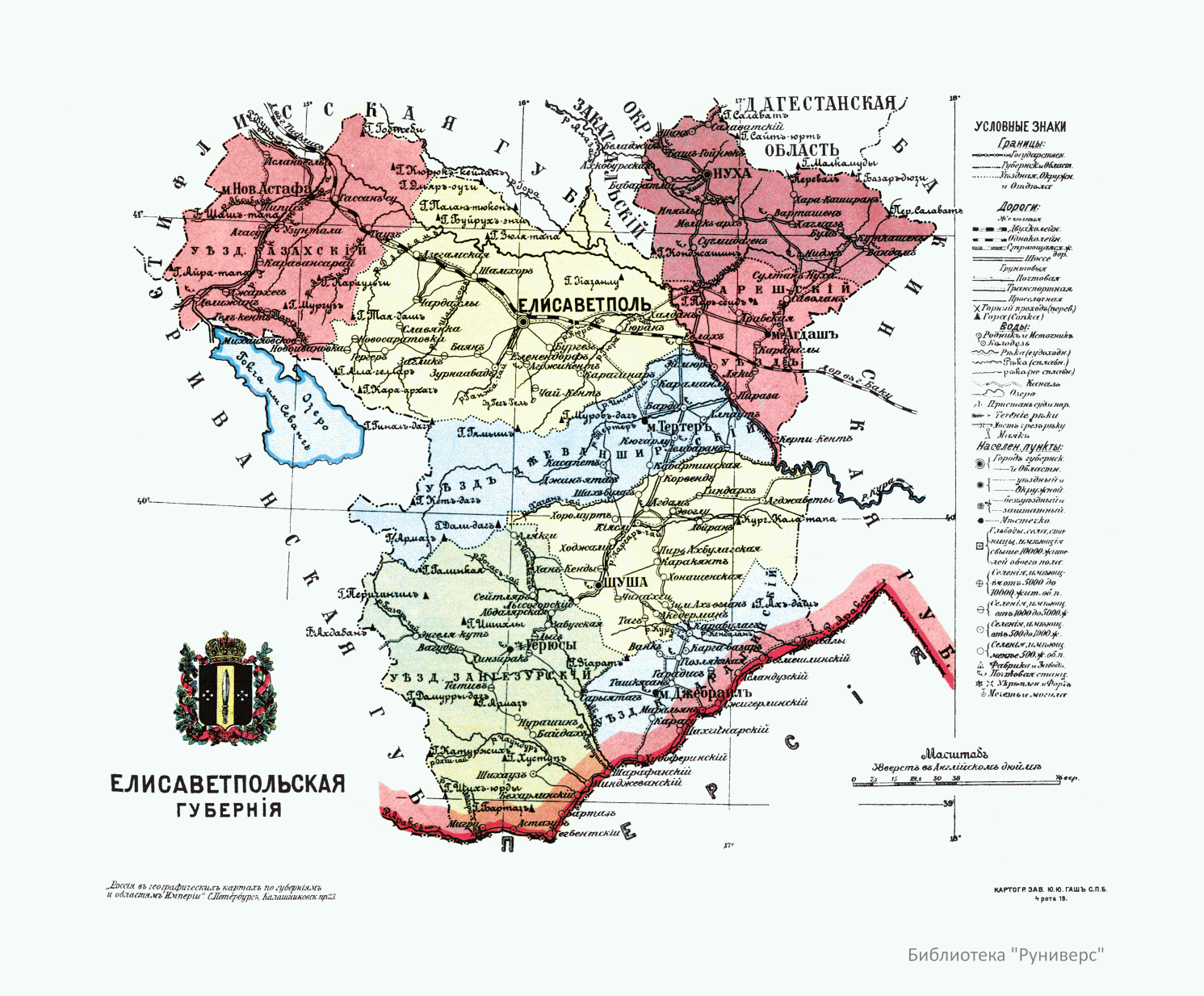
Elizavetpol Governorate

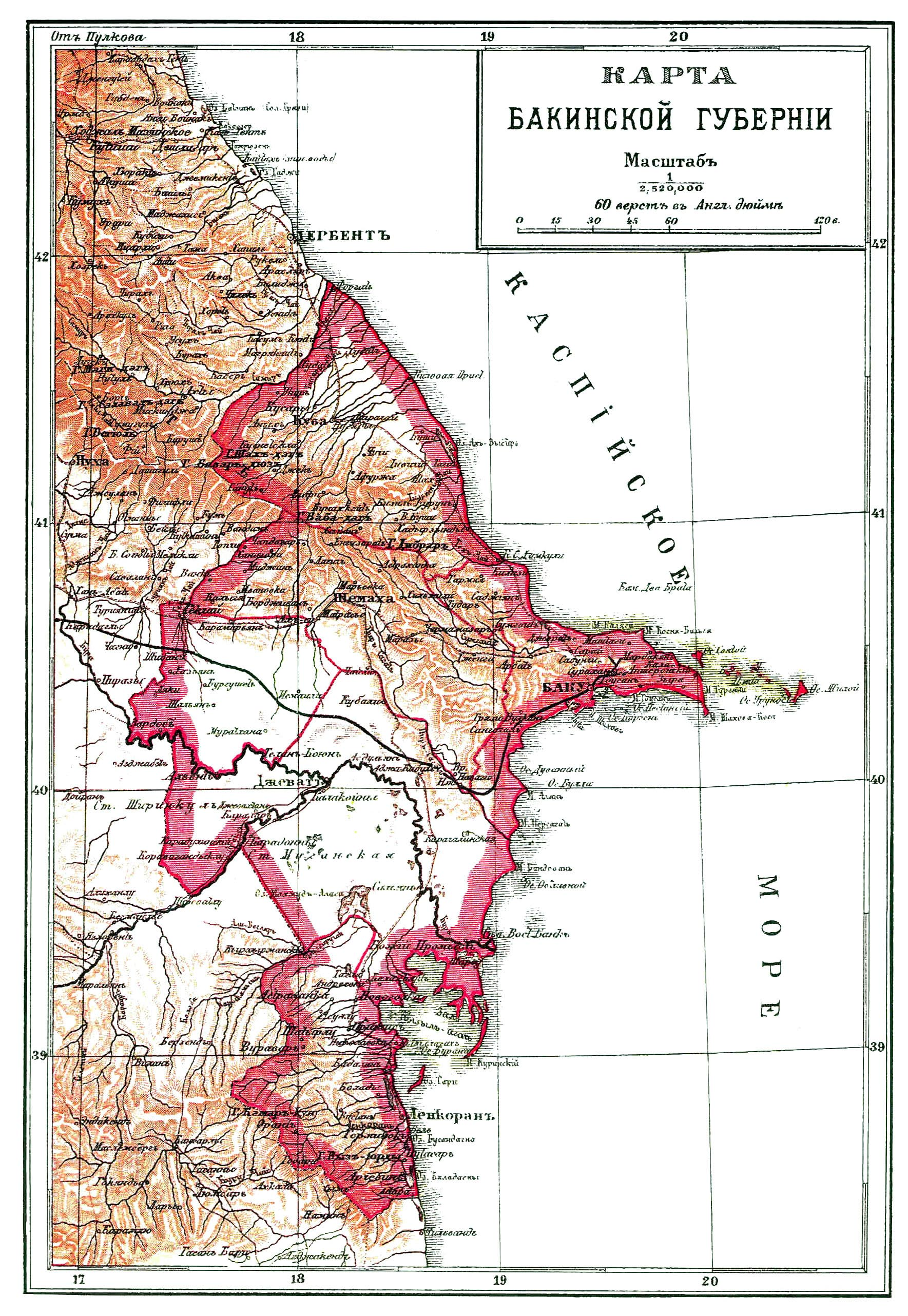
Baku Governorate

Maps of the former Baku and Elizavetpol governorates, the northern borders of which now form most of the modern Azerbaijan–Russia border

During the 19th century the Caucasus region was contested between the declining Ottoman Empire, Persia and Russia, which was expanding southwards. By the Russo-Persian War (1804–1813) and the subsequent Treaty of Gulistan, Russia acquired the bulk of what is now Azerbaijan and parts of Armenia. Russia organised the areas that now form Azerbaijan into the governorates of Baku and Elizavetpol (and the Zakatal Okrug within the Tiflis Governorate) – the northern border of these subdivisions effectively set the Azerbaijan–Russia border at its current location.

During the First World War Russian Communists staged a successful revolution in 1917, whilst the peoples of the southern Caucasus had declared the Transcaucasian Democratic Federative Republic in 1918. Internal disagreements led to Georgia leaving the federation in May 1918, followed shortly thereafter by Armenia and Azerbaijan. The northern border of Azerbaijan utilised the former provincial borders of the Baku, Elizabethpol and Tiflis governorates. In 1920 Russia's Red Army invaded Azerbaijan and Armenia, ending the independence of both, followed shortly thereafter by Georgia. All three states were incorporated into the Transcaucasian SFSR within the USSR, before being separated again in 1936.

The boundary became an international frontier in 1991 following the dissolution of the Soviet Union and the independence of its constituent republics. Border demarcation discussions then began, being completed in September 2010. Following ratification it entered into force the following year. The border agreement was criticised by some Communist Party deputies of the Russian State Duma, however the then head of Dagestan Magomedsalam Magomedov said that "Dagestan has not lost anything, but gained a lot more".

== Border crossings ==
There are five border crossings:

| Azeri name | Russian name | Type of crossing | location |
|---|---|---|---|
| Zuxul | Garakh | road | |
| Samur | Yarag-Kazmalyar | road | |
| Sirvanli | Novo-Filya | road | |
| Yalama | Tagirkent-Kazmalyar | rail | |
| Khanoba | Tagirkent-Kazmalyar | road | |
