= Ləcət =

Ləcət or Ledzhet may refer to:

- Ləcət, Khachmaz, Azerbaijan
- Ləcət, Qusar, Azerbaijan
