= Zuxuloba =

Zuxuloba may refer to:

- Zuxuloba, Khachmaz, Azerbaijan
- Zuxuloba, Qusar, Azerbaijan
