= Susayqışlaq =

Susayqışlaq or Susaykyshlak or Susaykyshlakh may refer to:

- Susayqışlaq, Khachmaz, Azerbaijan
- Susayqışlaq, Quba, Azerbaijan
