= Digahoba =

- Municipality
- Location within Azerbaijan
- Coordinates: 41°36′N 48°38′E
- Country: Azerbaijan
- Rayon: Khachmaz

Population
  - Total: 217
- Time zone: UTC+4 (AZT)
  - Summer (DST): UTC+5 (AZT)

Digahoba (also, Digyakhoba) is a village and the least populous municipality in the Khachmaz Rayon of Azerbaijan. It has a population of 217.
