= Ciğatay =

- Municipality
- Location within Azerbaijan
- Coordinates: 41°27′18″N 48°52′55″E
- Country: Azerbaijan
- Rayon: Khachmaz

Population
  - Total: 656
- Time zone: UTC+4 (AZT)
  - Summer (DST): UTC+5 (AZT)

Ciğatay (also, Cığatay, Cıqatay, Dzhigata, and Dzhigatay) is a village and municipality in the Khachmaz Rayon of Azerbaijan. It has a population of 656.
