= Qobuqıraq =

- Municipality
- Location within Azerbaijan
- Coordinates: 41°26′N 48°50′E
- Country: Azerbaijan
- Rayon: Khachmaz

Population
  - Total: 1,214
- Time zone: UTC+4 (AZT)
  - Summer (DST): UTC+5 (AZT)

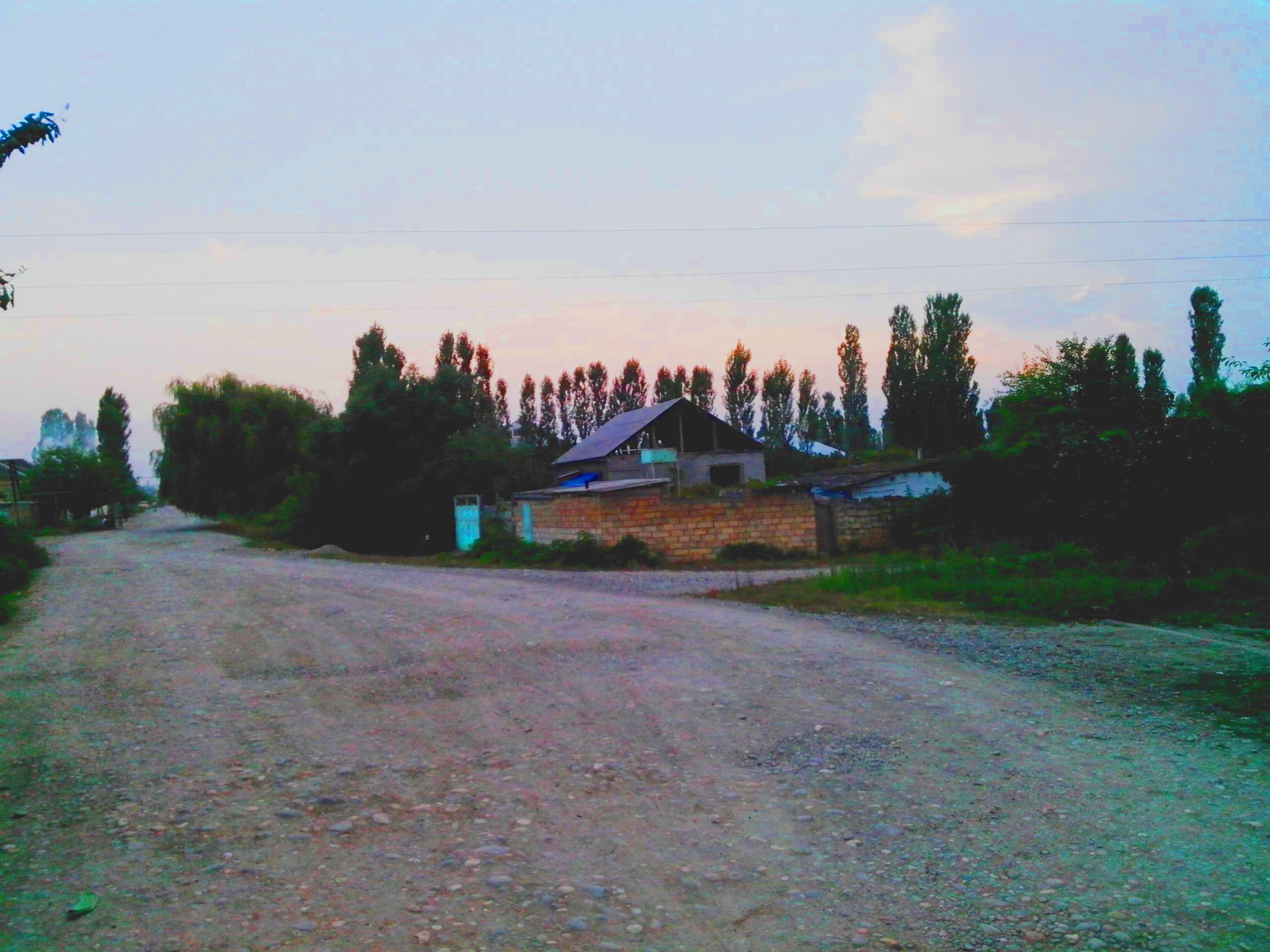
Qobuqıraq

Qobuqıraq (also, Qobuqqıraq, Kobukyrakh, and Kubakyrakh) is a village and municipality in the Khachmaz Rayon of Azerbaijan. It has a population of 1,214. The municipality consists of the villages of Qobuqıraq and Mürsəlliqışlaq.
