= Hacıməmmədoba =

- Location within Azerbaijan
- Coordinates: 41°34′20″N 48°37′48″E
- Country: Azerbaijan
- Rayon: Khachmaz
- Municipality: Pirquluoba
- Time zone: UTC+4 (AZT)
  - Summer (DST): UTC+5 (AZT)

Hacıməmmədoba (also, Gadzhimamedoba and Gadzhymamedoba) is a village in the Khachmaz Rayon of Azerbaijan. The village forms part of the municipality of Pirquluoba.
