= Gadzhyrustamoba =

- Location within Azerbaijan
- Coordinates: 41°32′N 48°41′E
- Country: Azerbaijan
- Rayon: Khachmaz
- Time zone: UTC+4 (AZT)
  - Summer (DST): UTC+5 (AZT)

Gadzhyrustamoba (also, Gadzhirustamoba) is a village in the Khachmaz Rayon of Azerbaijan. In Soviet times the village was the location of a small military base, which was dissolved in 1992. The military base was used as a testing ground for the T-72 tank, as the location in a semi-desert proved useful to assess the reliability of the tank in dusty and hot conditions.
