= Hacıisaoba =

Village in Azerbaijan

Coordinates: 41°29′N 48°45′E

Hajiisaoba (Azerbaijani: Hacıisaoba) is a village in the municipality of Gardashoba in the Khachmaz District of Azerbaijan.
