= Maqsudkənd =

- Municipality
- Location within Azerbaijan
- Coordinates: 41°39′33″N 48°36′42″E
- Country: Azerbaijan
- Rayon: Khachmaz

Population
  - Total: 628
- Time zone: UTC+4 (AZT)
  - Summer (DST): UTC+5 (AZT)

Maqsudkənd (also, Makhsudkend and Maksudkend) is a village and municipality in the Khachmaz Rayon of Azerbaijan. It has a population of 628.
