= Şıxhapıt =

- Location within Azerbaijan
- Coordinates: 41°24′N 48°47′E
- Country: Azerbaijan
- Rayon: Khachmaz
- Municipality: Qaraçaycek
- Time zone: UTC+4 (AZT)
  - Summer (DST): UTC+5 (AZT)

Şıxhapıt (also, Şıxhaput, Shykh-Gaput, and Shykhgapyt) is a village in the Khachmaz Rayon of Azerbaijan. The village forms part of the municipality of Qaraçaycek.
