= Mürşüdoba =

- Municipality
- Location within Azerbaijan
- Coordinates: 41°30′33″N 48°45′22″E
- Country: Azerbaijan
- Rayon: Khachmaz

Population
  - Total: 1,672
- Time zone: UTC+4 (AZT)
  - Summer (DST): UTC+5 (AZT)

Mürşüdoba (also, Murshudoba and Myurshyudoba) is a village and municipality in Khachmaz Rayon, Azerbaijan. It has a population of 1,672. The municipality consists of the villages of Mürşüdoba and Sabiroba.
