= Yaquboba =

- Location within Azerbaijan
- Coordinates: 41°44′45″N 48°36′35″E
- Country: Azerbaijan
- Rayon: Khachmaz
- Municipality: Yalama
- Time zone: UTC+4 (AZT)
  - Summer (DST): UTC+5 (AZT)

Yaquboba (also, Yaguboba) is a village in the Khachmaz Rayon of Azerbaijan. The village forms part of the municipality of Yalama.
