= Fərzəlioba =

- Location within Azerbaijan
- Coordinates: 41°38′21″N 48°37′57″E
- Country: Azerbaijan
- Rayon: Khachmaz
- Municipality: İdrisoba
- Time zone: UTC+4 (AZT)
  - Summer (DST): UTC+5 (AZT)

Fərzəlioba is a village in the Khachmaz Rayon of Azerbaijan. The village forms part of the municipality of İdrisoba.
