= Ukuroba =

- Location within Azerbaijan
- Coordinates: 41°45′N 48°34′E
- Country: Azerbaijan
- Rayon: Khachmaz
- Municipality: Yalama
- Time zone: UTC+4 (AZT)
  - Summer (DST): UTC+5 (AZT)

Ukuroba (also, Uxuroba) is a village in the Khachmaz Rayon of Azerbaijan. The village forms part of the municipality of Yalama.
