= Sabiroba =

- Location within Azerbaijan
- Coordinates: 41°37′40″N 48°47′21″E
- Country: Azerbaijan
- Rayon: Khachmaz
- Municipality: Mürşüdoba
- Time zone: UTC+4 (AZT)
  - Summer (DST): UTC+5 (AZT)

Sabiroba is a village in the Khachmaz Rayon of Azerbaijan. The village forms part of the municipality of Mürşüdoba.
