= Qusarçay =

- Municipality
- Location within Azerbaijan
- Coordinates: 41°34′18″N 48°44′26″E
- Country: Azerbaijan
- Rayon: Khachmaz

Population
  - Total: 4,776
- Time zone: UTC+4 (AZT)
  - Summer (DST): UTC+5 (AZT)

Qusarçay (also, Kusarchay) is a village and municipality in the Khachmaz Rayon of Azerbaijan. It has a population of 4,776.
