= Pirquluoba =

- Municipality
- Location within Azerbaijan
- Coordinates: 41°32′26″N 48°40′30″E
- Country: Azerbaijan
- Rayon: Khachmaz

Population
  - Total: 2,841
- Time zone: UTC+4 (AZT)
  - Summer (DST): UTC+5 (AZT)

Pirquluoba (also, Pirkulioba and Pirkuluoba) is a village and municipality in the Khachmaz Rayon of Azerbaijan. It has a population of 2,841. The municipality consists of the villages of Pirquluoba, Qoçaqqazma, Yeni Sudur and Hacıməmmədoba.
