= Alıcqışlaq =

- Municipality
- Location within Azerbaijan
- Coordinates: 41°23′N 48°44′E
- Country: Azerbaijan
- Rayon: Khachmaz

Population
  - Total: 532
- Time zone: UTC+4 (AZT)
  - Summer (DST): UTC+5 (AZT)

Alıcqışlaq (also, Alıçqışlaq, Alychkyshlak, and Alydzhkyshlakh) is a village and municipality in the Khachmaz Rayon of Azerbaijan. It has a population of 532.
