= Qadaşoba =

Human settlement in Azerbaijan

Coordinates: 41°30′N 48°44′E

Gardashoba (Azerbaijani: Qardaşoba) is a village and municipality in the Khachmaz District of Azerbaijan. It has a population of 1,384. The municipality consists of the villages of Gardashoba, Agharahimoba, and Hajiisaoba.
