= Aşağı Zeyid =

- Municipality
- Location within Azerbaijan
- Coordinates: 41°22′55″N 48°47′40″E
- Country: Azerbaijan
- Rayon: Khachmaz

Population
  - Total: 908
- Time zone: UTC+4 (AZT)
  - Summer (DST): UTC+5 (AZT)

Aşağı Zeyid (also, Aşağı Zeyd, Ashaga Zeid, Ashaga-Zeyd, Ashagy Zeid, and Ash-Zeid) is a village and municipality in the Khachmaz Rayon of Azerbaijan. It has a population of 908.
