= Tağaroba =

- Location within Azerbaijan
- Coordinates: 41°42′23″N 48°36′05″E
- Country: Azerbaijan
- Rayon: Khachmaz
- Municipality: Ləcət
- Time zone: UTC+4 (AZT)
  - Summer (DST): UTC+5 (AZT)

Tağaroba is a village in the Khachmaz Rayon of Azerbaijan. The village forms part of the municipality of Ləcət.
