= Yeni Sudur =

Human settlement in Azerbaijan

Coordinates: 41°32′N 48°40′E

Yeni Sudur Yeni Sүdүр
- Village
- Location within Azerbaijan
- Country: Azerbaijan
- Rayon: Khachmaz
- Municipality: Pirquluoba
- Postal code: AZ2700

Yeni Sudur is a village in the municipality of Pirquluoba in the Khachmaz Rayon of Azerbaijan.
