= Xanlıqoba =

- Municipality
- Location within Azerbaijan
- Coordinates: 41°22′56″N 48°55′08″E
- Country: Azerbaijan
- Rayon: Khachmaz

Population
  - Total: 429
- Time zone: UTC+4 (AZT)
  - Summer (DST): UTC+5 (AZT)

Xanlıqoba (also, Khanlykhoba and Khanlykoba) is a village and municipality in the Khachmaz Rayon of Azerbaijan. It has a population of 429.
