= Çarxı =

- Municipality
- Location within Azerbaijan
- Coordinates: 41°23′35″N 48°52′16″E
- Country: Azerbaijan
- Rayon: Khachmaz

Population
  - Total: 2,900
- Time zone: UTC+4 (AZT)
  - Summer (DST): UTC+5 (AZT)

Çarxı (also, Charkhi, Charkhy, and Charkhy Khyrdaoymakh) is a village and municipality in the Khachmaz Rayon of Azerbaijan. It has a population of 2,900.
