= Mollabürhanlı =

- Municipality
- Location within Azerbaijan
- Coordinates: 41°26′56″N 48°42′57″E
- Country: Azerbaijan
- Rayon: Khachmaz

Population
  - Total: 927
- Time zone: UTC+4 (AZT)
  - Summer (DST): UTC+5 (AZT)

Mollabürhanlı (also, Mollaburkhanly and Mollabyurkhanly) is a village and municipality in the Khachmaz Rayon of Azerbaijan. It has a population of 927. The municipality consists of the villages of Mollabürhanlı, Maşioba, and Çuxuroba.
