= Mürsəlliqışlaq =

- Location within Azerbaijan
- Coordinates: 41°26′N 48°49′E
- Country: Azerbaijan
- Rayon: Khachmaz
- Municipality: Qobuqıraq
- Time zone: UTC+4 (AZT)
  - Summer (DST): UTC+5 (AZT)

Mürsəlliqışlaq (also, Mirzakishlak, Mursaali-Kishlyagi, and Myursallikyshlak) is a village in the Khachmaz Rayon of Azerbaijan. The village forms part of the municipality of Qobuqıraq.
