= Əbilyataq =

- Municipality
- Location within Azerbaijan
- Coordinates: 41°32′28″N 48°53′33″E
- Country: Azerbaijan
- Rayon: Khachmaz

Population
  - Total: 563
- Time zone: UTC+4 (AZT)
  - Summer (DST): UTC+5 (AZT)

Əbilyataq is a village on the Caspian Sea and a municipality in the Khachmaz Rayon of Azerbaijan. It has a population of 563.
