= Battle of Yalama =

- Part of Southern Front of the Russian Civil War
Date	28 April 1920
Location	Yalama, Azerbaijan
Result	Red Army victory

Belligerents
Red Army; Azerbaijani Communists	Azerbaijan Democratic Republic

Commanders and leaders
Anastas Mikoyan; Gazanfar Musabekov	(Azerbaijan Democratic Republic) Agali Babazadeh

Strength
Thousands	350

Casualties and losses
Heavy	Heavy

Battle of Yalama (Azerbaijani: Yalama döyüşü) took place on April 28, 1920, in the territory of Yalama between the Yala garrison of the Quba regiment of the National Army of the Azerbaijan People's Republic and the XI Red Army.

At 00:05 on April 28, 1920, the 11th Red Army of 70,000 crossed the bridge over the Samur River, led by the Third International, three more armored trains and a 300-man infantry. Anastas Mikoyan and Gazanfar Musabayov also came to Azerbaijan to establish a Soviet government on Russian bayonets.

They are surprised to see soldiers of the infantry and six cavalry armored trains guarding the bridge. Because only a few hours ago, they were dancing on this bridge with the Russian officers and soldiers who are now coming to them with guns, talking about friendship and brotherhood... It is not difficult for the Russians to break the resistance of a small group with artillery and machine gun fire. After that, the train goes to Yalama. Along the way, they are followed by cavalry patrols of Azerbaijanis from the forest on the side of the railway.

The Russians want to attack Yalama suddenly. Their landing cuts the telephone lines connecting the station and the border checkpoints. However, two companies armed with several light artillery and machine guns, a cavalry squadron of 300 people and a small gendarmerie detachment under the command of Agali Babazadeh, an officer of the Quba Regiment of the Azerbaijani Army, are waiting for the enemy near the station. The garrison was alerted by cavalry patrols. But the forces were extremely unequal. There was no hope that Hamdulla Efendi would be able to help anyone except a group of volunteers.

The first collision occurred one kilometer before the station. Azerbaijanis send a locomotive against armored trains from Yalama. The aim is to cause an accident, disrupt the railway and block the trains. However, the boiler of the steam engine was blown up by two accurate cannon fire from "III International". The locomotive slows down and stops before it reaches the train. After that, a heavy battle begins. The positions of Azerbaijani artillerymen and machine guns are destroyed by armored trains. A Russian paratrooper, backed by shrapnel and machine gun fire, attacked.

The licking garrison lasted two hours.350 fighters guard the station until their last breath. Survivors retreat to join guerrilla groups.

The Russian paratroopers also suffered heavy losses in the battle. For example, one of the famous commanders of the XI Red Army, a veteran of the 28th division Nemikin also died in this battle.

== See also ==
- Battle of Sarvan
