= İdrisoba =

- Municipality
- Location within Azerbaijan
- Coordinates: 41°37′53″N 48°37′43″E
- Country: Azerbaijan
- Rayon: Khachmaz

Population
  - Total: 716
- Time zone: UTC+4 (AZT)
  - Summer (DST): UTC+5 (AZT)

İdrisoba is a village and municipality in the Khachmaz District of Azerbaijan. It has a population of 716. The municipality consists of the villages of İdrisoba and Fərzəlioba.
