= Yeni Qazma =

- Location within Azerbaijan
- Coordinates: 41°32′24″N 48°39′59″E
- Country: Azerbaijan
- Rayon: Khachmaz
- Time zone: UTC+4 (AZT)
  - Summer (DST): UTC+5 (AZT)

Yeni Qazma (also, Sudurkazma) is a village in the Khachmaz Rayon of Azerbaijan.
