= Naburlu =

- Location within Azerbaijan
- Coordinates: 41°30′N 48°53′E
- Country: Azerbaijan
- Rayon: Khachmaz
- Time zone: UTC+4 (AZT)
  - Summer (DST): UTC+5 (AZT)

Naburlu is a village in the Khachmaz Rayon of Azerbaijan.
