= Həbibkənd =

- Municipality
- Location within Azerbaijan
- Coordinates: 41°31′59″N 48°37′30″E
- Country: Azerbaijan
- Rayon: Khachmaz

Population
  - Total: 665
- Time zone: UTC+4 (AZT)
  - Summer (DST): UTC+5 (AZT)

Həbibkənd (also, Gabibkend and Gabib-Kend) is a village and municipality in the Khachmaz Rayon of Azerbaijan. It has a population of 665.
