= Qoçaqqazma =

Village in Azerbaijan

Coordinates: 41°34′N 48°38′E

Qoçaqqazma is a village in the municipality of Pirquluoba in the Khachmaz District of Azerbaijan.
