= Pərdiqıran =

- Location within Azerbaijan
- Coordinates: 41°40′41″N 48°40′39″E
- Country: Azerbaijan
- Rayon: Khachmaz
- Municipality: Susayqışlaq
- Time zone: UTC+4 (AZT)
  - Summer (DST): UTC+5 (AZT)

Pərdiqıran (also, Perdigran and Pyardagyran) is a village in the Khachmaz Rayon of Azerbaijan. The village forms part of the municipality of Susayqışlaq.
