= Çuxuroba =

- Location within Azerbaijan
- Coordinates: 41°28′N 48°44′E
- Country: Azerbaijan
- Rayon: Khachmaz
- Municipality: Mollabürhanlı
- Time zone: UTC+4 (AZT)
  - Summer (DST): UTC+5 (AZT)

Çuxuroba (also, Chukhuroba) is a village in the Khachmaz Rayon of Azerbaijan. The village forms part of the municipality of Mollabürhanlı.
