= Hülövlü =

- Municipality
- Location within Azerbaijan
- Coordinates: 41°24′20″N 48°48′44″E
- Country: Azerbaijan
- Rayon: Khachmaz

Population
  - Total: 1,528
- Time zone: UTC+4 (AZT)
  - Summer (DST): UTC+5 (AZT)

Hülövlü (also, Gyulevle, Gyulevli, and Gyulevlyu) is a village and municipality in the Khachmaz Rayon of Azerbaijan. It has a population of 1,528.
