= Suxtaqalaqışlaq =

Village in Azerbaijan

Coordinates: 41°23′N 48°43′E

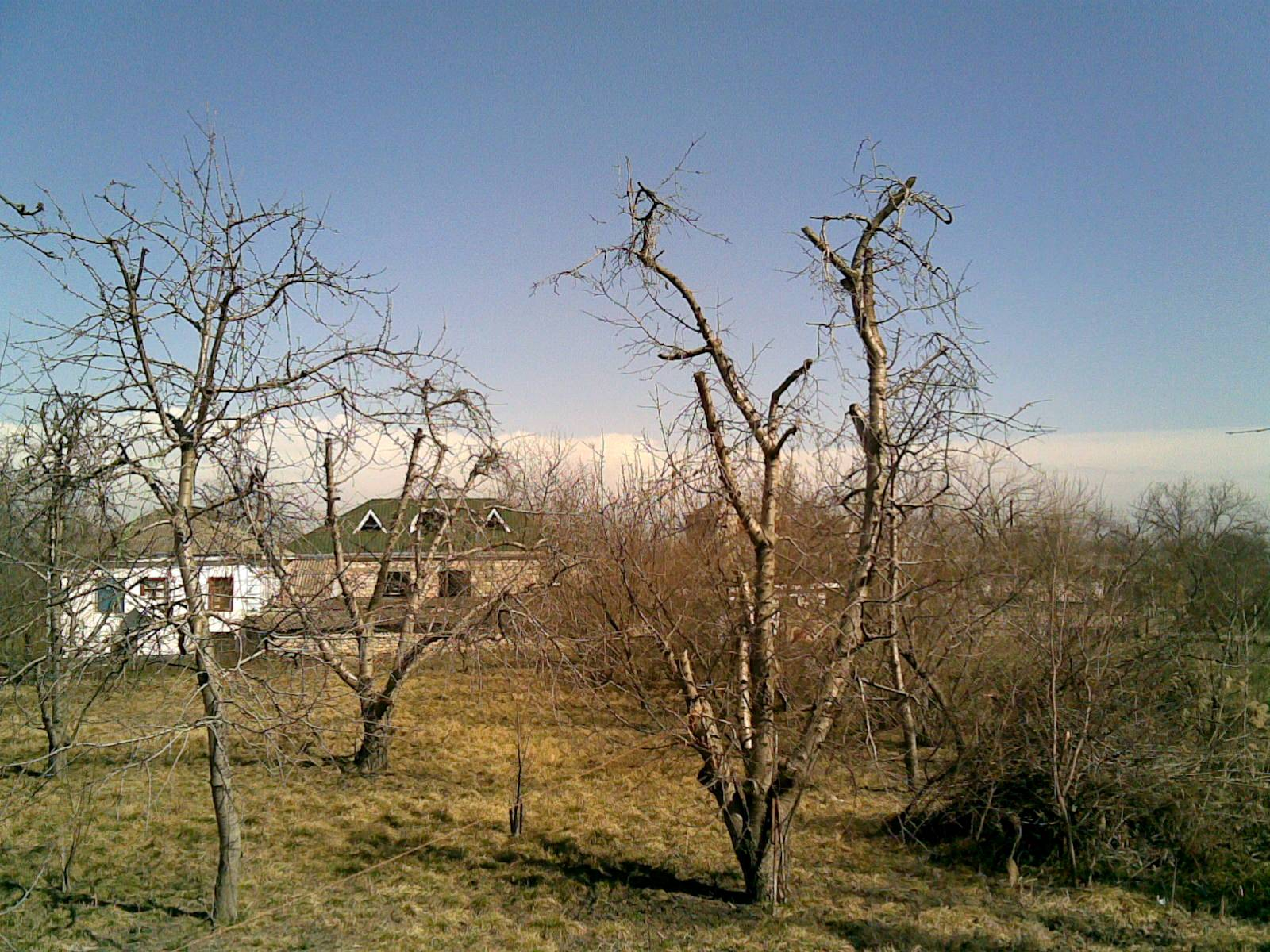
Sukhtagalagyshlag, 9 March 2013

Sukhtagalagyshlag - (Azerbaijani: Suxtaqalaqışlaq) is a village and municipality in the Khachmaz District of Azerbaijan. It has a population of 230.
