= Ortaoba =

- Location within Azerbaijan
- Coordinates: 41°46′N 48°34′E
- Country: Azerbaijan
- Rayon: Khachmaz
- Municipality: Yalama
- Time zone: UTC+4 (AZT)
  - Summer (DST): UTC+5 (AZT)

Ortaoba is a village in the Khachmaz Rayon of Azerbaijan. The village forms part of the municipality of Yalama.
