= Tikanoba =

- Municipality
- Location within Azerbaijan
- Coordinates: 41°35′10″N 48°50′37″E
- Country: Azerbaijan
- Rayon: Khachmaz

Population
  - Total: 371
- Time zone: UTC+4 (AZT)
  - Summer (DST): UTC+5 (AZT)

Tikanoba (also, Tikanlıoba, Tikyanlioba, and Tikyanlyoba) is a village and municipality in the Khachmaz Rayon of Azerbaijan. It has a population of 371.
