= Həsənqoca =

- Location within Azerbaijan
- Coordinates: 41°41′40″N 48°42′40″E
- Country: Azerbaijan
- Rayon: Khachmaz
- Time zone: UTC+4 (AZT)
  - Summer (DST): UTC+5 (AZT)

Həsənqoca (also, Gasangadzhar-Seidlyar and Gasankodzha) is a village in the Khachmaz Rayon of Azerbaijan.
