= Ağtala =

- Municipality
- Location within Azerbaijan
- Coordinates: 41°32′23″N 48°45′56″E
- Country: Azerbaijan
- Rayon: Khachmaz

Population
  - Total: 377
- Time zone: UTC+4 (AZT)
  - Summer (DST): UTC+5 (AZT)

Ağtala (also, Rodnikovka) is a village and municipality in the Khachmaz Rayon of Azerbaijan. It has a population of 377.
