= Qaraçaycek =

- Municipality
- Location within Azerbaijan
- Coordinates: 41°23′29″N 48°46′24″E
- Country: Azerbaijan
- Rayon: Khachmaz

Population
  - Total: 994
- Time zone: UTC+4 (AZT)
  - Summer (DST): UTC+5 (AZT)

Qaraçaycek (also, Qaraçaycək and Karachaydzhek) is a village and municipality in the Khachmaz Rayon of Azerbaijan. It has a population of 994. The municipality consists of the villages of Qaraçaycək and Şıxhapıt.
