= Ağarəhimoba =

Agharahimoba
- Azerbaijani: Ağarəhimoba
- Location within Azerbaijan
- Coordinates: 41°30′N 48°41′E
- Country: Azerbaijan
- District: Khachmaz
- Municipality: Gardashoba
- Time zone: UTC+4 (AZT)
  - Summer (DST): UTC+5 (AZT)

Ağarəhimoba (also, Agharahimoba) is a village in the Khachmaz District of Azerbaijan.The village forms part of the municipality of Gardashoba.
