= Əvəcükoba =

- Location within Azerbaijan
- Coordinates: 41°44′14″N 48°36′39″E
- Country: Azerbaijan
- Rayon: Khachmaz
- Time zone: UTC+4 (AZT)
  - Summer (DST): UTC+5 (AZT)

Əvəcükoba (also, Evadzhukoba and Evedzhyuk-Kyshlakh) is a village in the Khachmaz Rayon of Azerbaijan.
