= Nərəcan =

- Municipality
- Location within Azerbaijan
- Coordinates: 41°32′13″N 48°45′06″E
- Country: Azerbaijan
- Rayon: Khachmaz

Population
  - Total: 2,692
- Time zone: UTC+4 (AZT)
  - Summer (DST): UTC+5 (AZT)

Nərəcan (also, Naradzhan and Neredzhan) is a village and municipality in the Khachmaz Rayon of Azerbaijan. It has a population of 2,692.
