= İkinci Yalama =

- Location within Azerbaijan
- Coordinates: 41°50′00″N 48°36′30″E
- Country: Azerbaijan
- Rayon: Khachmaz
- Time zone: UTC+4 (AZT)
  - Summer (DST): UTC+5 (AZT)

İkinci Yalama (also, Ikindzhi-Yalama, Rybnyy Promysel Yalama Nomer Vtoroy, Yalama Nomer Vtoroy, and Yalama Vtoraya) is a village in the Khachmaz Rayon of Azerbaijan.
