= Zeyxuroba =

- Location within Azerbaijan
- Coordinates: 41°47′01″N 48°33′49″E
- Country: Azerbaijan
- Rayon: Khachmaz
- Municipality: Yalama
- Time zone: UTC+4 (AZT)
  - Summer (DST): UTC+5 (AZT)

Zeyxuroba (also, Xanoba, Khanoba, and Zeykhuroba) is a village in the Khachmaz Rayon of Azerbaijan. The village forms part of the municipality of Yalama. The postal code is AZ 2730.
