= Zuxuloba, Khachmaz =

Zuxuloba
- Location within Azerbaijan
- Coordinates: 41°44′42″N 48°32′09″E
- Country: Azerbaijan
- Rayon: Khachmaz
- Municipality: Yalama
- Time zone: UTC+4 (AZT)
  - Summer (DST): UTC+5 (AZT)

Zuxuloba (also, Zukhuloba) is a village in the Khachmaz Rayon of Azerbaijan. The village forms part of the municipality of Yalama.
