= Ləcət, Khachmaz =

Ləcət
- Municipality
- Location within Azerbaijan
- Coordinates: 41°41′45″N 48°37′17″E
- Country: Azerbaijan
- Rayon: Khachmaz

Population
  - Total: 2,637
- Time zone: UTC+4 (AZT)
  - Summer (DST): UTC+5 (AZT)

Ləcət (also, Ledzhet) is a village and municipality in the Khachmaz Rayon of Azerbaijan. It has a population of 2,637. The municipality consists of the villages of Ləcət, Muruqoba, and Tağaroba.
