= Şirvanovka =

- Municipality
- Location within Azerbaijan
- Coordinates: 41°41′41″N 48°29′20″E
- Country: Azerbaijan
- Rayon: Qusar

Population
  - Total: 1,210
- Time zone: UTC+4 (AZT)
  - Summer (DST): UTC+5 (AZT)

Şirvanovka (also, Şırvanovka and Shirvanovka) is a village and municipality in the Qusar Rayon of Azerbaijan next to the Azerbaijan–Russia border. It has a population of 1,210. The municipality consists of the villages of Şirvanovka and Zuxuloba.
