= Battle of Sarvan =

- Part of Southern Front of the Russian Civil War
| Date | April 1920 |
| Location | Sarvan, Devechi |
| Result | Red Army victory |

Belligerents
| Azerbaijan Democratic Republic | (Russian Soviet Federative Socialist Republic) Red Army |

Commanders and leaders
| (Azerbaijan Democratic Republic) Gazanfar Musabekov (Azerbaijan Democratic Republic) Gachag Mayil | (Russian Soviet Federative Socialist Republic) Anastas Mikoyan |

Battle of Sarvan took place between the National Army of the Azerbaijan Democratic Republic and the 11th Army at the "Sarvan" station of Shabran District on April 27, 1920.

== Battle ==
After the beginning of the occupation of Azerbaijan by the Bolshevik army, the train of the 11th Army was forcibly stopped at the Sarvan station by a group led by Ghachak Mayil. Defeated after the Battle of Yalama, the leader of the anti-revolutionary group, Gachag Mayil, discussed ending the resistance. But Mayil's son Ibrahim, who served in the National Army of the Azerbaijan Democratic Republic, objected to this, so the place for the second battle was chosen. This time, the rails were dismantled at Sarvan station in Devechi (now Shabran). Around noon, the train carrying the Red Army arrived, and thanks to the dismantled rails, erected barricades and armed residents, was stopped. At the same time, an appeal was made from the train through a loudspeaker:

Do not open fire, we have something to say!

The person who appealed to the militants from the train was Hamdulla Afandi Afandizadeh's cousin, Ibrahim's schoolmate and Mir Jafar Baghirov's foster brother, Gazanfar Musabekov. After Musabeyov's appeal, the shooting stopped and Musabeyov got off the train and began to speak:

Ibrahim, it's me. Go away, we have nothing to do with you. You also know that blocking our road is a loss for Turkey. We are going to Anatolia, give way. If you hit, you will be damaged. The Red Army cannot be defeated.

After Musabekov returned to the train, Ibrahim Bey opened fire on the train and a fight began. Armed with machine guns, the Bolsheviks, easily suppressed the disorganized local attackers. Mayil, who led the group, saw that they were defeated and retreated to Babadag with the survivors.

== See also ==
- Battle of Yalama
