= Çinartala =

- Location within Azerbaijan
- Coordinates: 41°32′45″N 48°43′23″E
- Country: Azerbaijan
- Rayon: Khachmaz
- Municipality: Çinartala
- Time zone: UTC+4 (AZT)
  - Summer (DST): UTC+5 (AZT)

Çinartala (also, Chinartala) is a village in the Khachmaz Rayon of Azerbaijan. The village forms part of the municipality of Çinartala.
