= Susayqışlaq, Khachmaz =

Susayqışlaq
- Municipality
- Location within Azerbaijan
- Coordinates: 41°39′30″N 48°40′29″E
- Country: Azerbaijan
- Rayon: Khachmaz

Population
  - Total: 1,303
- Time zone: UTC+4 (AZT)
  - Summer (DST): UTC+5 (AZT)

Susayqışlaq (also, Susaykyshlak and Susaykyshlakh) is a village and municipality in the Khachmaz Rayon of Azerbaijan. It has a population of 1,303. The municipality consists of the villages of Susayqışlaq and Pərdiqıran.
