= Yalama =

- Municipality
- Location within Azerbaijan
- Coordinates: 41°45′31″N 48°34′40″E
- Country: Azerbaijan
- Rayon: Khachmaz

Population
  - Total: 4,762
- Time zone: UTC+4 (AZT)
  - Summer (DST): UTC+5 (AZT)

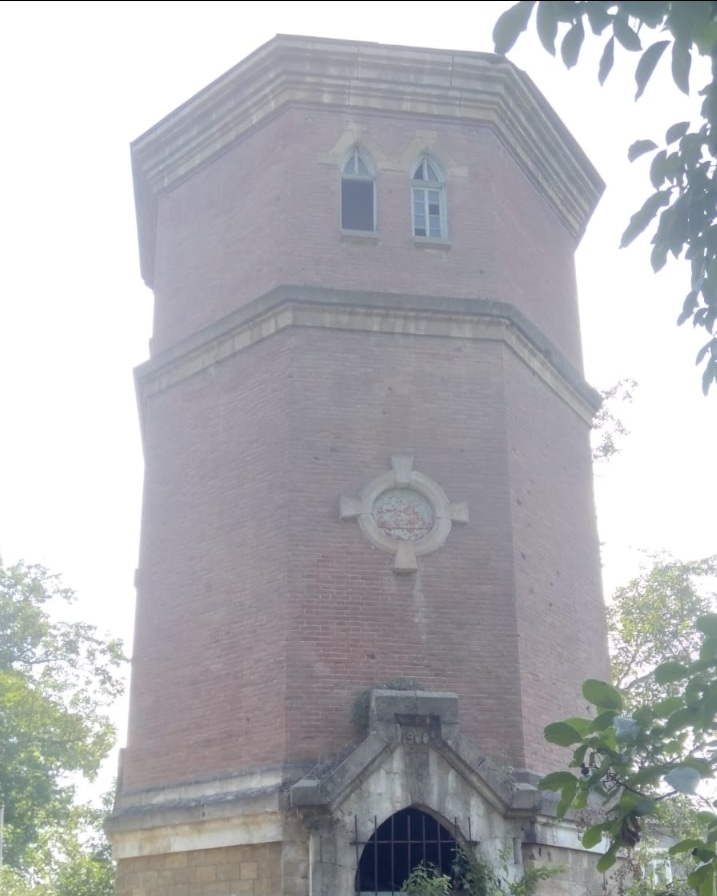

Yalama is a village and municipality in the Khachmaz Rayon of Azerbaijan, located adjacent to the Azerbaijan–Russia border. It has a population of 4,762. The municipality consists of the villages of Yalama, Düztahiroba, Səlimoba, Ortaoba, Ukuroba, Yaquboba, Zeyxuroba, and Zuxuloba.
