= Zuxul =

- Municipality
- Location within Azerbaijan
- Coordinates: 41°29′00″N 48°05′04″E
- Country: Azerbaijan
- Rayon: Qusar

Population
  - Total: 372
- Time zone: UTC+4 (AZT)
  - Summer (DST): UTC+5 (AZT)

Zuxul (also, Tsukhul’ and Zukhul) is a village and municipality in the Qusar Rayon of Azerbaijan on the Azerbaijan–Russia border. It has a population of 372. Some of them live in Australia.
