= Ləcət, Qusar =

Ləcət
- Municipality
- Location within Azerbaijan
- Coordinates: 41°32′36″N 48°19′10″E
- Country: Azerbaijan
- Rayon: Qusar

Population
  - Total: 650
- Time zone: UTC+4 (AZT)
  - Summer (DST): UTC+5 (AZT)

Ləcət (also, Ledzhet) is a village and municipality in the Qusar Rayon of Azerbaijan. It has a population of 650.
