= Filya =

Filya Филя ЦIийи Филер
- Selo
- Location within Republic of Dagestan Location within Russia
- Coordinates: 41°43′N 48°27′E
- Country: Russia
- Region: Republic of Dagestan
- District: Magaramkentsky District
- Time zone: UTC+3:00

Filya (Russian: Филя; Lezgian: ЦIийи Филер) is a rural locality (a selo) in Magaramkentsky District, Republic of Dagestan, Russia. The population was 2,402 as of 2010. There are 8 streets.

== Geography ==
Filya is located 22 km northeast of Magaramkent (the district's administrative centre) by road, on the left bank of the Samur River. Khodzha-Azmalyar and Kabir-Kazmalyar are the nearest rural localities.

== Nationalities ==
Lezgins live there.
