= Garakh =

Garakh Гарах Гъарагь
- Selo
- Location within Republic of Dagestan Location within Russia
- Coordinates: 41°28′N 48°02′E
- Country: Russia
- Region: Republic of Dagestan
- District: Magaramkentsky District
- Time zone: UTC+3:00

Garakh (Russian: Гарах; Lezgian: Гъарагь) is a rural locality (a selo) and the administrative centre of Garakhsky Selsoviet, Magaramkentsky District, Republic of Dagestan, Russia. The population was 362 as of 2010. There are 4 streets.

== Geography ==
Garakh is located 219 km southeast of Makhachkala, on the Samur River. Maka-Kazmalyar is the nearest rural locality.

== Nationalities ==
Lezgins live there.
