= Zuxuloba, Qusar =

Zuxuloba
- Location within Azerbaijan
- Coordinates: 41°42′49″N 48°29′36″E
- Country: Azerbaijan
- Rayon: Qusar
- Municipality: Şirvanovka
- Time zone: UTC+4 (AZT)
  - Summer (DST): UTC+5 (AZT)

Zuxuloba (also, Zuxul) is a village in the Qusar Rayon of Azerbaijan. The village forms part of the municipality of Şirvanovka.
