= Tagirkent-Kazmalyar =

Tagirkent-Kazmalyar Тагиркент-Казмаляр ТIигьирдин Къазмаяр
- Selo
- Location within Republic of Dagestan Location within Russia
- Coordinates: 41°48′N 48°30′E
- Country: Russia
- Region: Republic of Dagestan
- District: Magaramkentsky District
- Time zone: UTC+3:00

Tagirkent-Kazmalyar (Russian: Тагиркент-Казмаляр; Lezgian: ТIигьирдин Къазмаяр) is a rural locality (a selo) and the administrative centre of Tagirkent-Kazmalyarsky Selsoviet, Magaramkentsky District, Republic of Dagestan, Russia. The population was 3,005 as of 2010. There are 14 streets.

== Geography ==
Tagirkent-Kazmalyar is located 33 km northeast of Magaramkent (the district's administrative centre) by road. Khtun-Kazmalyar and Samur are the nearest rural localities.

== Nationalities ==
Lezgins live there.
