= Susayqışlaq, Quba =

Human settlement in Azerbaijan

Susayqışlaq is a village and municipality in the Quba Rayon of Azerbaijan. It has a population of 475.
