= Khachmaz District =

District in northeastern Azerbaijan

Coordinates: 41°28′N 48°48′E

- District
- Azerbaijani: Xaçmaz rayonu
- Map of Azerbaijan showing Khachmaz District
- Country: Azerbaijan
- Region: Guba-Khachmaz
- Established: 8 August 1930
- Capital: Khachmaz
- Settlements: 151

Government
  - Governor: Elnur Rzayev

Area
  - Total: 1,060 km^{2} (410 sq mi)

Population (2020)
  - Total: 179,800
  - Density: 170/km^{2} (439/sq mi)
- Time zone: UTC+4 (AZT)
- Postal code: 2700
- Website: www.xachmaz-ih.gov.az

Khachmaz District (Azerbaijani: Xaçmaz rayonu; Lezgian: Хъачмаз район) is one of the 66 districts of Azerbaijan. It is located in the northeast of the country and belongs to the Guba-Khachmaz Economic Region. The district borders the districts of Qusar, Quba, Shabran, and the Russian Republic of Dagestan. Its capital and largest city is Khachmaz. As of 2020, the district had a population of 179,800.

== History ==
Khachmaz is one of the border districts of Azerbaijan in the north of the republic. The district was established on August 8, 1930, as an administrative territory. It was a town-type settlement during 1936–1937. In 1963, the Khachmaz region was abolished and its territory included to Guba and Gusar districts. In 1995 the district was restored.

== Location ==
Being the most northeastern region of Azerbaijan, Khachmaz is geographically located in Europe. It sits between the Caucasus Mountains and borders the Caspian Sea to the east. The southern border greets Shabran and the region stretches north to Russia. Khachmaz city is located toward the bottom third of the region. It is about 10 km from the Caspian Sea and the border to Shabran. About half that distance to the Quba border to Khachmaz's west. It is a substantially greater distance to the northern border.

== Population ==
Ethnic groups in Khachmaz (2009)
1. Azerbaijanis (72.7%)
2. Lezgins (15.5%)
3. Tats (5.70%)
4. Others (6.10%)

According to the State Statistical Committee of the country, in 2000, the total population of the region was 145,600. In 2018, this figure increased by about 30,000.

Population of regions (at the beginning of the year, thsd. persons)
Region	2000	2001	2002	2003	2004	2005	2006	2007	2008	2009	2010	2011	2012	2013	2014	2015	2016	2017	2018
Khachmaz region	145,6	147,1	148,5	149,8	151,1	152,9	154,6	155,9	157,5	159	160,3	162,1	164,5	166,8	169,0	171,2	173,1	174,8	176,3
Urban population	51,3	51,9	52,5	53,0	59,3	60,2	60,7	61,2	62	62,6	63,0	63,5	64,1	64,8	65,4	66,0	66,6	67,1	67,6
Rural population	94,3	95,2	96,0	96,8	91,8	92,7	93,9	94,7	95,5	96,4	97,3	98,6	100,4	102,0	103,6	105,2	106,5	107,7	108,7

== Education ==
There are 123 secondary schools, 25 preschools, 2 out-of-school institutions, one vocational high school, and one vocational school in the region.

== Climate ==
The climate is generally moderate to warm, humid temperate and subtropical, and Khachmaz sees an average yearly precipitation of 1300–1350 mm and average temperatures of 25-30 °C in July and 1-2 °C in January.

== Cultural ==
The Khachmaz region is rich with monuments of history, culture, and architecture. Some of the most significant are Sarkartapa, the ancient city-fortress Khudat, a 4th-century Albanian church, the 16th-century mosque-madrasa of Shah Abbas of the 15th-16th century in Garaqurtlu, a village in Khachmaz, ancient settlements and the barrows of the Bronze Age, and the famous “Iron Gate” of Derbent fortress becoming a symbol of its inaccessibility. The fortifications “Baba-al-Abvat” were constructed in the 8th-7th centuries B.C and protected from invasion of the northern boundaries of Azerbaijan. Today Khachmaz borders with Russia here. In the village of Shykhlar, the tourists can see the earliest monument of the mausoleum of the Middle Ages- a mosque of Sheikh Yusif (15th century). At the top of the mountain Galadag, the ruins of the Gaurgala fortress have been kept.

=== Museums ===
- Regional Ethnography Museum: This museum is located in the city centre. The museum is very rich with over 4,000 archaeological findings from the different periods of Khachmaz's history. Of especial interest are the original scientific works of the orientalist Abuabdullah Mahammad-bin Albukhari contained in the "Aljazaily sani" as well as the "Classification of Koran," authored by the mathematician, philosopher from Chilaqyr Hajaly Efendi.
- Veteran's Museum: 8,739 Khachmaz residents fought in World War II for the Red Army, and some 2,800 of them perished. This museum also remembers 230 people who died in the ethnic conflict with Armenia during the early 1990s.
- Heydar Aliyev's Museum: a personality cult shrine to independent Azerbaijan's first ruler.
- The Museum of Prominent Figures: open-air museum in a park filled with fountains and numerous statues of prominent Azerbaijanis.
- Carpet Museum: contains many ancient carpets along with carpet weaving implements, designs, dolls dressed in ancient national style, and a picture gallery.

=== Parks ===
- Heydar Aliyev Park: contains trees, flowers, fountains, lights, cafes, and tea houses. The Heydar Aliyev Museum, the Khazar Cinema-Clubare all located in this park.
- Park of Culture and Rest: contains statues of different animals, artificial ponds stocked with colourful fish, rivers, and fountains. Khachmaz city library, Carpet Museum, Post Office, and several cafes are located within the park.
