= Molinae =

Molinae may refer to:

- Pyrrhura molinae
- Ugni molinae
- Solanum molinae
- Gentlea molinae
- Viburnum molinae
- Galeus molinae
- Cetopsorhamdia molinae
- Arion molinae
- Monstera molinae
- Xerocrassa molinae
- Symplocos molinae
- Succisella andreae-molinae
- Akodon molinae
- Amphitecna molinae
- Carex molinae
- Lonchocarpus molinae
