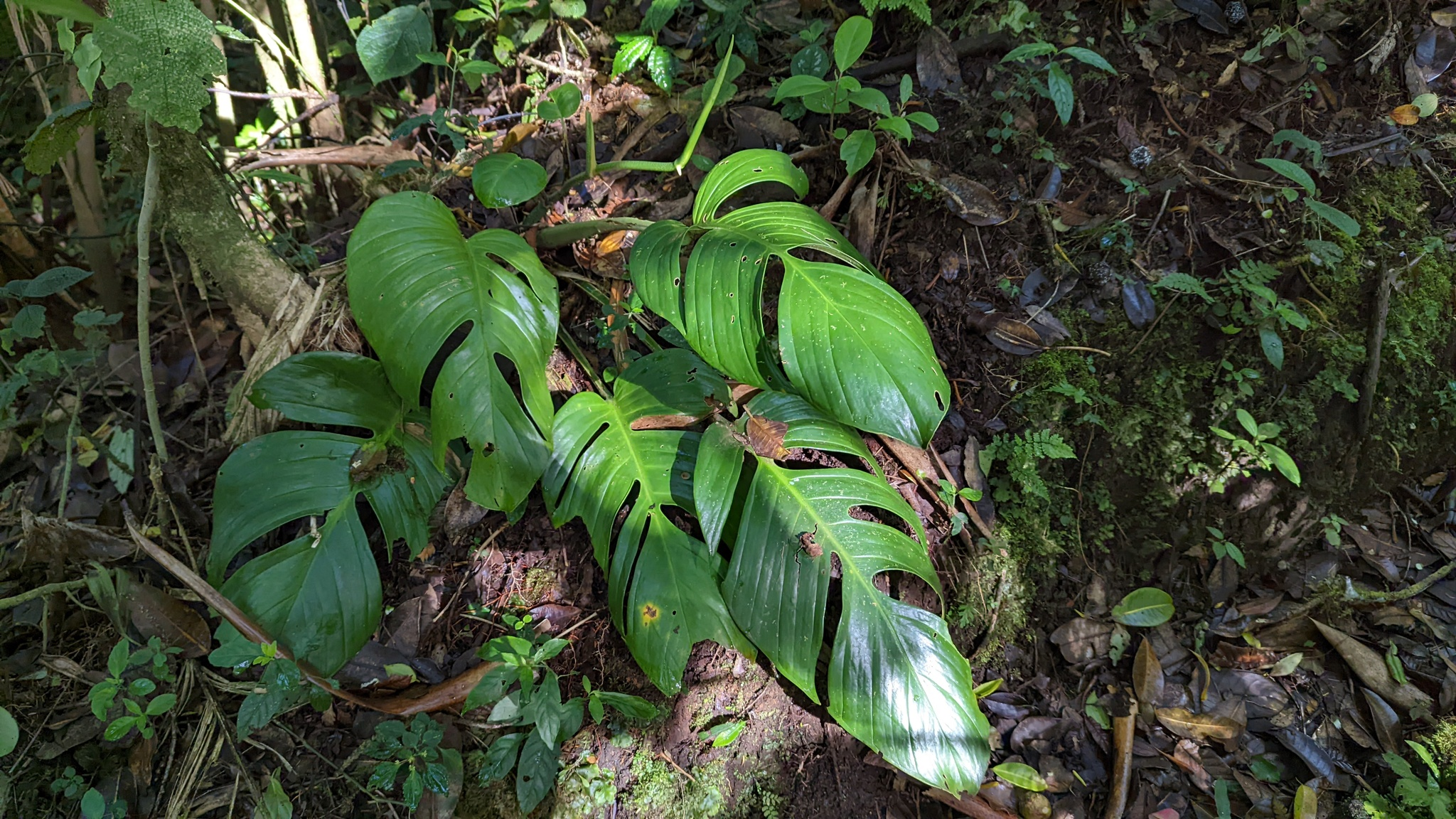
- M. monteverdensis growing in Puntarenas

Scientific classification
- Kingdom: Plantae
- Clade: Tracheophytes
- Clade: Angiosperms
- Clade: Monocots
- Order: Alismatales
- Family: Araceae
- Genus: Monstera
- Species: M. monteverdensis

Binomial name
- Monstera monteverdensis M.Cedeño & Croat in Cedeño-Fonseca et al., 2020

= Monstera monteverdensis =

Species of flowering plant

Monstera monteverdensis is a species of flowering plant in the arum family, Araceae. Its adult form is characterized by pinnatifid margins with up to eight lobes per side, with occasional fenestrations away from the midrib. Leaves can grow as large as 60 cm (24 in) long and 30 cm (12 in) wide. It is named after the city of Monteverde, where the species is abundant.

== Distribution ==
Monstera monteverdensis is native to Costa Rica, in particular the Cordillera de Guanacaste and Tilaran Mountains. It has been confused in cultivation with other species of the genus such as Monstera epipremnoides, Monstera lentii, and Monstera lechleriana. M. epipremnoides has pinnatifid leaves with more lobes and more frequent fenestrations than M. monteverdensis. M. lechleriana differs from M. monteverdensis because of its persistent petiolar sheathes and thicker spathe.
