= Monstera alfaroi =

Scientific classification
- Kingdom: Plantae
- Clade: Tracheophytes
- Clade: Angiosperms
- Clade: Monocots
- Order: Alismatales
- Family: Araceae
- Genus: Monstera
- Species: M. alfaroi

Binomial name
- Monstera alfaroi Croat & M.Cedeño

Species of flowering plant

Monstera alfaroi is a flowering plant in the arum family. It is endemic to mid-altitude premontane rainforests of Costa Rica at altitudes of 1,100 to 1,250 metres (3,610 to 4,100 ft). M. alfaroi features light brown petioles with black or white warts. It is closely related to Monstera buseyi, but M. alfaroi can be distinguished by its larger inflorescence. M. alfaroi is also easily confused with M. costaricensis, which can be distinguished from M. alfaroi by its petioles with white pustules, more conical inflorescence, and location; M. costaricensis only occurs in lowland areas of Costa Rica below 600 metres (2,000 ft). Mature plants have ovate leaf blades as long as 90 centimetres (35 in) and 45 centimetres (18 in) wide, with few circular fenestrations near the midrib. From petiole to blade tip, M. alfaroi leaves can be up to 160 centimetres (63 in) long. It has a white spadix and an externally light green spathe. Flowering has been recorded in November, and fruiting in January.
