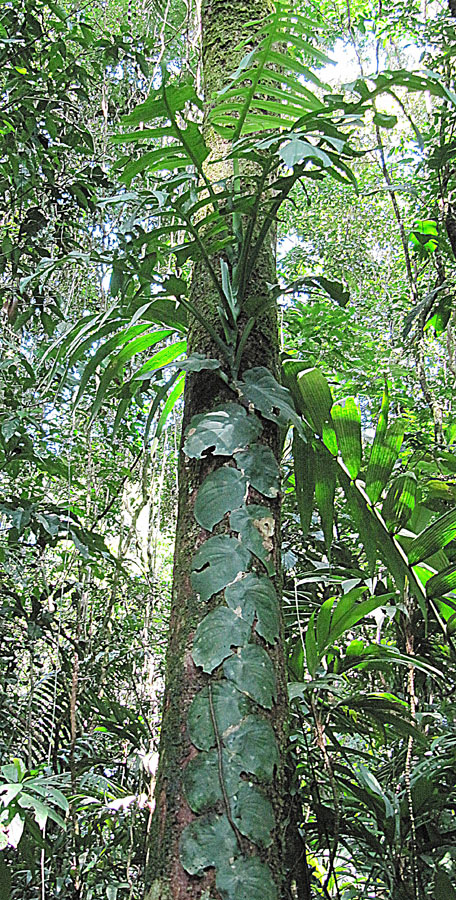
- Monstera tenuis in Costa Rica, showing both the shingling juvenile leaves and mature, fenestrated foliage

Scientific classification
- Kingdom: Plantae
- Clade: Tracheophytes
- Clade: Angiosperms
- Clade: Monocots
- Order: Alismatales
- Family: Araceae
- Genus: Monstera
- Species: M. tenuis

Binomial name
- Monstera tenuis K.Koch

Synonyms
- Monstera gigantea Engl.; Marcgravia paradoxa W.Bull

= Monstera tenuis =

Species of plant

Monstera tenuis (common name Chirravaca) is a species of flowering plant in the family Araceae. It is native to Central America, from Nicaragua to Panama. It grows in wet tropical habitats below 1,600 meters (5,200 ft). Like many others in its genus, like Monstera dubia, the plant starts life on the forest floor and then as a root climber climbs tree trunks to a height of 30 metres in a shingling fashion with leaves tightly appressed to the surface of the trunk. When it reaches a sufficient height, the leaf morphology dramatically changes to pinnate in nature, and it develops very long aerial roots. The name of the species, which means "thin" in Latin, refers to the juvenile leaves.
