= Monstera juliusii =

Scientific classification
- Kingdom: Plantae
- Clade: Tracheophytes
- Clade: Angiosperms
- Clade: Monocots
- Order: Alismatales
- Family: Araceae
- Genus: Monstera
- Species: M. juliusii

Binomial name
- Monstera juliusii M.Cedeño & Croat in Cedeño-Fonseca et al., 2020

Species of plant

Monstera juliusii is a flowering plant in the family Araceae. It is native to high-altitude cloud forests of Costa Rica at altitudes of 1,600 to 2,250 metres (5,250 to 7,380 ft) and occasionally confused with Monstera standleyana. However, M. standleyana has green petioles, few fenestrations and thin leaves, while M. juliusii is characterized by mottled white petioles, frequent fenestrations at maturity and thick, leathery leaves. Mature plants have pinnatilobed leaves as long as 60 cm (24 in) and 30 cm (12 in) wide, with circular fenestrations close to the margins, and oval fenestrations near the midrib. The species is named after Julius Johnson, son of the artists Rashid Johnson and Sheree Hovsepian.

== Distribution ==
This plant is native to Costa Rica.
