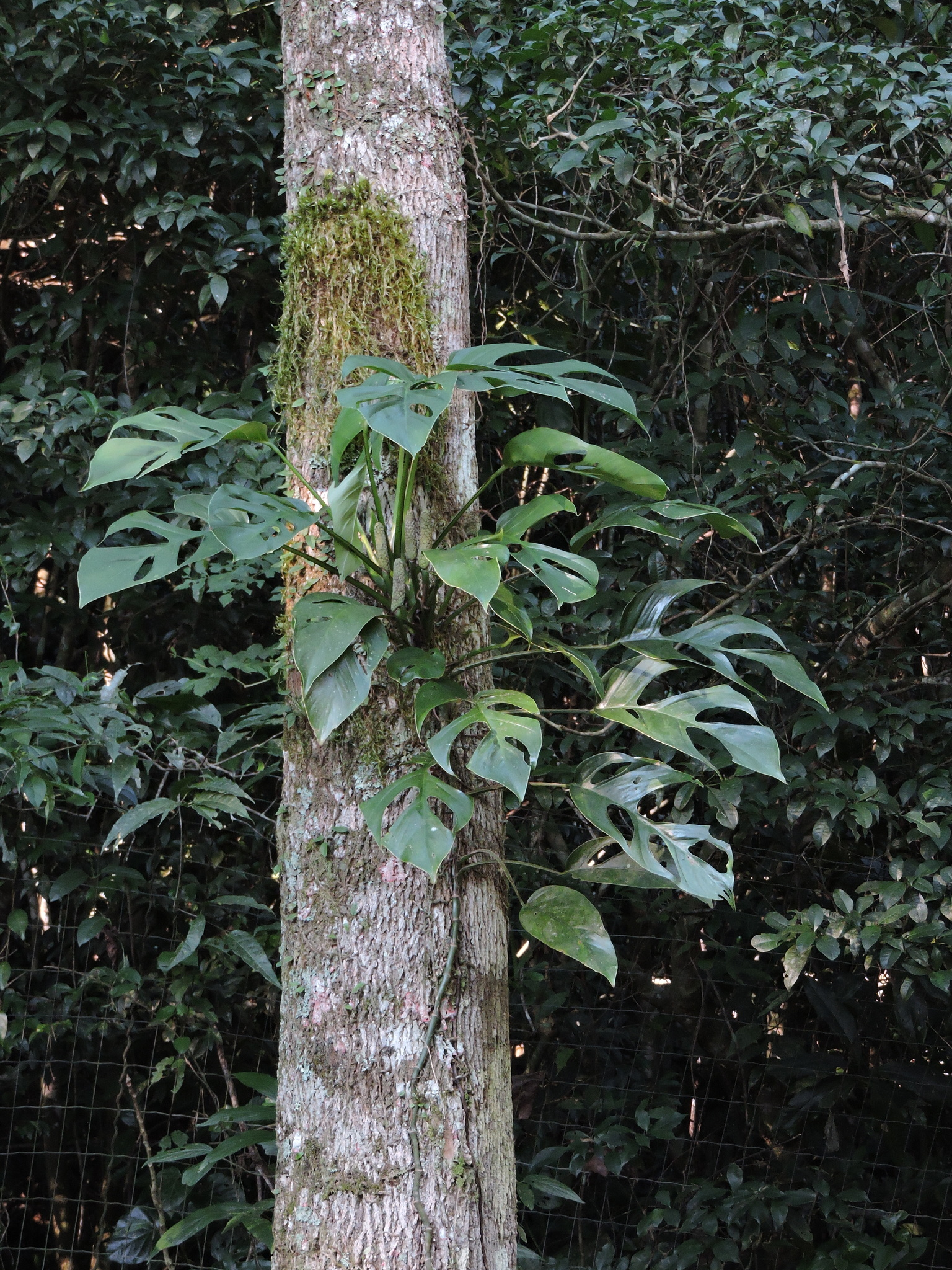
- Monstera praetermissa in habitat

Scientific classification
- Kingdom: Plantae
- Clade: Tracheophytes
- Clade: Angiosperms
- Clade: Monocots
- Order: Alismatales
- Family: Araceae
- Genus: Monstera
- Species: M. praetermissa

Binomial name
- Monstera praetermissa E.G.Gonç. & Temponi

= Monstera praetermissa =

Species of plant

Monstera praetermissa is a species of plant in the genus Monstera native to Brazil. It grows in wet tropical forests from 50–900 metres (160–2,950 ft) in elevation. It is most similar to Monstera obliqua and Monstera xanthospatha, but differs from these in habitat (Brazil) and in its inflorescence. Like many in its genus, the species transitions from a juvenile leaf shape, typically at about 15 centimetres (5.9 in) in growth, to an adult leaf that has up to five perforations per side. Its species name means "overlooked" in Latin, due to its only recent scientific description in 2004 and lack of attention from collectors.
