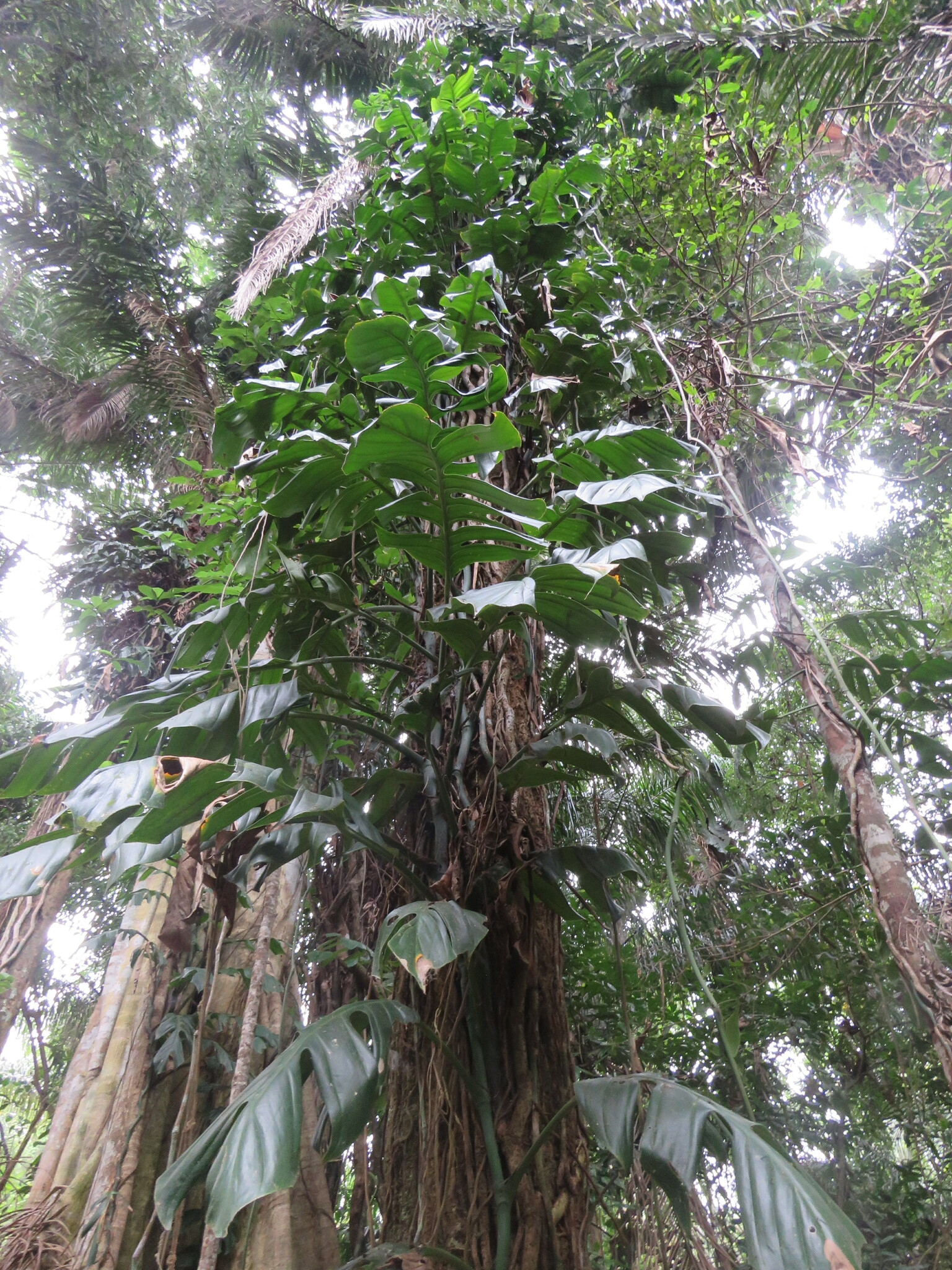
- Monstera spruceana in Bolivia

Scientific classification
- Kingdom: Plantae
- Clade: Tracheophytes
- Clade: Angiosperms
- Clade: Monocots
- Order: Alismatales
- Family: Araceae
- Genus: Monstera
- Species: M. spruceana

Binomial name
- Monstera spruceana Schott

= Monstera spruceana =

Species of plant

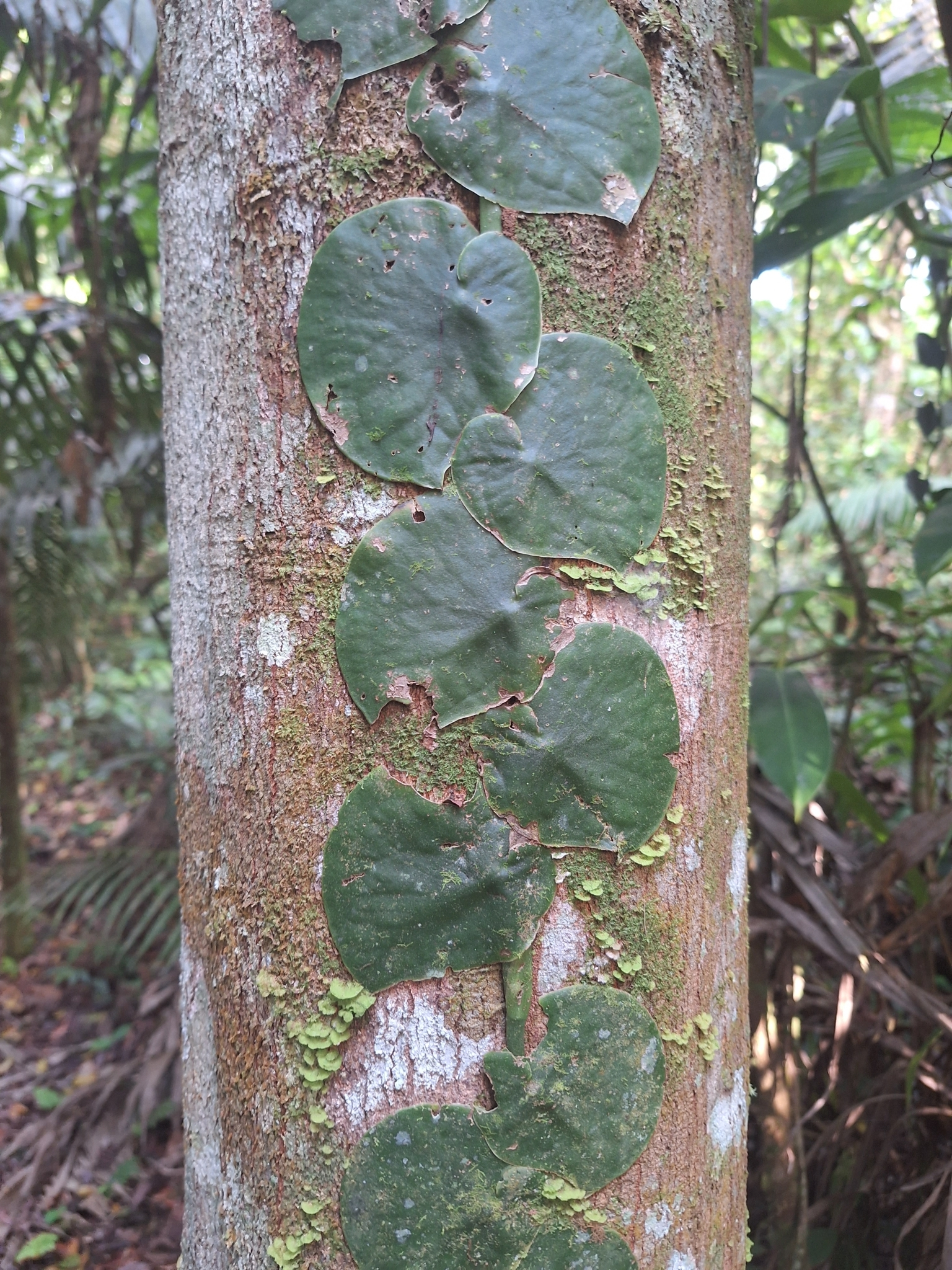
Juvenile phase

Monstera spruceana is a species of plant in the genus Monstera native to Central and South America from Costa Rica to Bolivia. Named after Richard Spruce, Monstera spruceana is a climbing plant that as a juvenile has a shingling growth habit against the trunks of trees, then in maturity develops pinnate leaves, though only one side may be pinnate. The adult form of this species closely resembles Monstera subpinnata and Monstera dilacerata. The plant is used as traditional medicine by the Shuar and Kichwa people.
