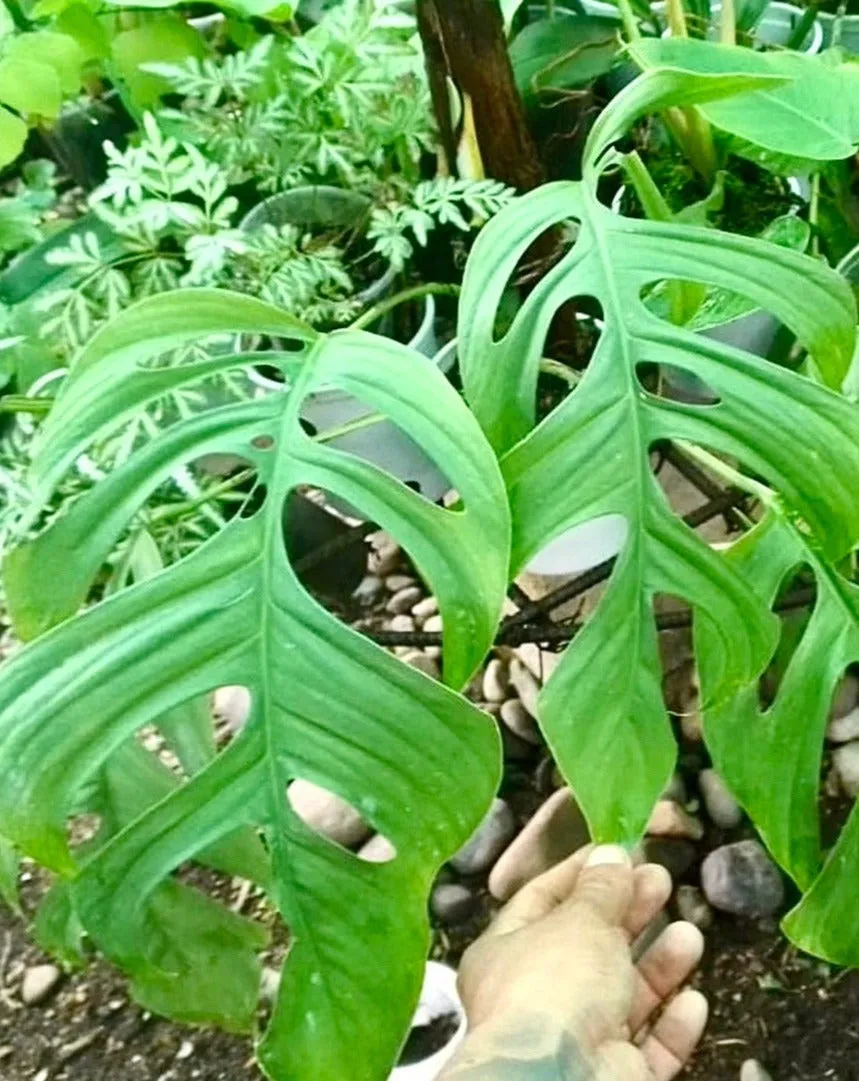

Scientific classification
- Kingdom: Plantae
- Clade: Tracheophytes
- Clade: Angiosperms
- Clade: Monocots
- Order: Alismatales
- Family: Araceae
- Genus: Monstera
- Species: M. gracilis

Binomial name
- Monstera gracilis Engl.

= Monstera gracilis =

Species of plant

Monstera gracilis is a flowering plant in family Araceae.

== Description ==
Monstera gracilis is a species of climbing flowering plant native to eastern Colombia. Unlike many other Monstera species, it does not climb to significant heights but instead produces stolons that return to the ground.

This species is distinguished by its thin, membranaceous leaves, deciduous petiole, sheath wings, and relatively slender stems. It has smaller spadices and a more delicate structure compared to related species such as Monstera dissecta and Monstera adansonii. The leaves are pinnatifid, and both the spathe and spadix are smaller than those of its close relatives.

== Distribution ==
It is native to southern Venezuela and Northern Peru. They can also be found in riparian forests of the llanos
