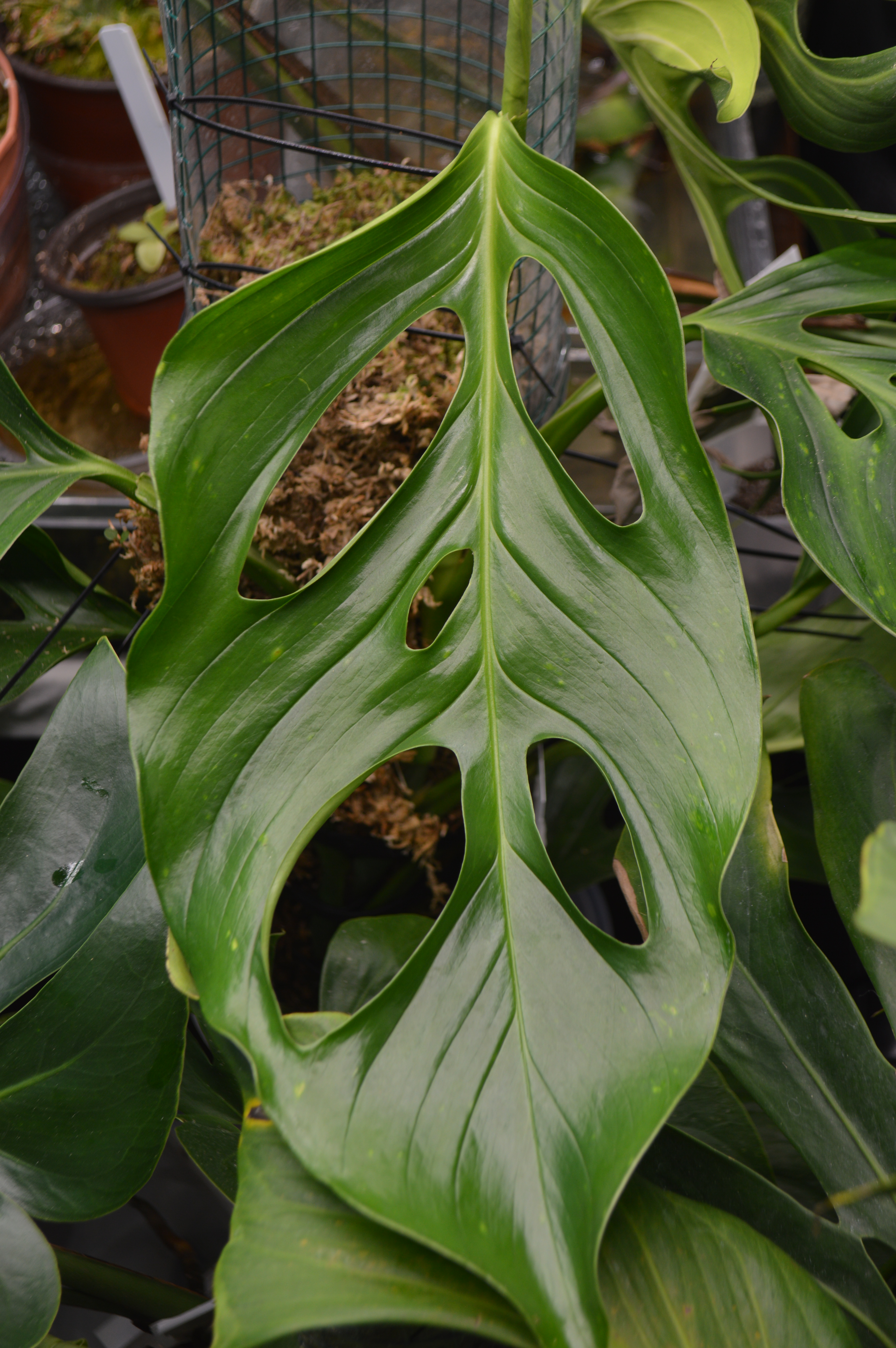

Scientific classification
- Kingdom: Plantae
- Clade: Tracheophytes
- Clade: Angiosperms
- Clade: Monocots
- Order: Alismatales
- Family: Araceae
- Genus: Monstera
- Species: M. acacoyaguensis

Binomial name
- Monstera acacoyaguensis Matuda

= Monstera acacoyaguensis =

Species of flowering plant

Monstera acacoyaguensis is a flowering plant in the family Araceae and the genus Monstera, section Monstera. its native range is Mexico (Chiapas) to Belize, at altitudes below 200 meters (656 ft). As an adult, it grows as an epiphyte. Juvenile plants grow as terrestrial creepers, and undergo dramatic morphogenesis upon reaching a suitable climbing surface. Adult plants have green, smooth petioles 40-65 centimeters (16-26 in) long, with adaxially glossy, leathery, ovate leaf blades that rapidly truncate to the petiole, 60-85 centimeters (24-33 in) long and 35-45 centimeters (14-18 in) wide. Its fenestrations are numerous, ovate, and mostly originate mid-rib, sometimes in two to three rows. These perforations curl adaxially, and are 2-5 centimeters (.8-2 in) wide and 4-12 centimeters (1.6-5 in) long. Monstera acacoyaguensis has a light yellow to cream-colored spathe, 25-30 centimeters (10-12 in) wide and 25-35 centimeters (10-14 in) tall. Its spadix is yellow and cylindric, 1.5-2 centimeters (0.6-0.8 in) wide and 18-22 centimeters (7-9 in) long. Its seeds have not been described. It has been described as having an unusually persistent spathe, lasting up to 20 days at maturity in comparison to other monstera, who only flower for two to three days. M. acacoyaguensis is also notable because, unlike most other monstera, it naturally grows in conditions of full sunlight.

Monstera acacoyaguensis is similar to m. lechleriana but is readily distinguished by several characteristics. First is its native habitat- m. lechleriana grows in Bolivia, Colombia, and other South American countries, while m. acacoyaguensis has only been observed further north, in Mexico and Belize. M. lechleriana also grows at higher altitude- mostly above 800 meters (2625 ft), and often has one row of smaller ovate perforations, or two rows of different sizes, with the smaller row closer to the midrib.
