= Monstera croatii =

Scientific classification
- Kingdom: Plantae
- Clade: Tracheophytes
- Clade: Angiosperms
- Clade: Monocots
- Order: Alismatales
- Family: Araceae
- Genus: Monstera
- Species: M. croatii

Binomial name
- Monstera croatii M.Cedeño & A.Hay

Species of flowering plant

Monstera croatii is a flowering plant in the family Araceae. It is endemic to Costa Rica at altitudes of 300–600 meters (980–1,970 ft). It is unique within the genus for being a primarily terrestrial grower, able to reach adult size without an epiphytic growth habit, whereas other monstera will remain in a creeping juvenile state until finding a suitable media for climbing and maturing. It will typically climb up to one meter (3.3 feet) before flowering. Adult plants have smooth, blue-tinged green petioles up to 45 centimetres (18 in) long, with oblong, deeply pinnatifid leaf blades up to 45 centimetres (18 in) long and 33 centimetres (13 in) wide. Adult specimens do not form fenestrations. Its spathe is up to 14 centimetres (5.5 in) long, externally white-yellow at anthesis, with a white spadix 8 centimetres (3.1 in) long. Mature fruits and seeds have not been observed, and no fertile specimens have been collected to date. M. croatii has immature infructescences recorded in February, with flowers observed in October and November.

M. croatii is easily confused with Monstera pinnatipartita, but can be differentiated in several ways. First, M. pinnatipartita will never develop its adult vegetative form terrestrially; second, it has white-speckled petioles, unlike the glaucous and smooth petioles observed in M. croatii.
