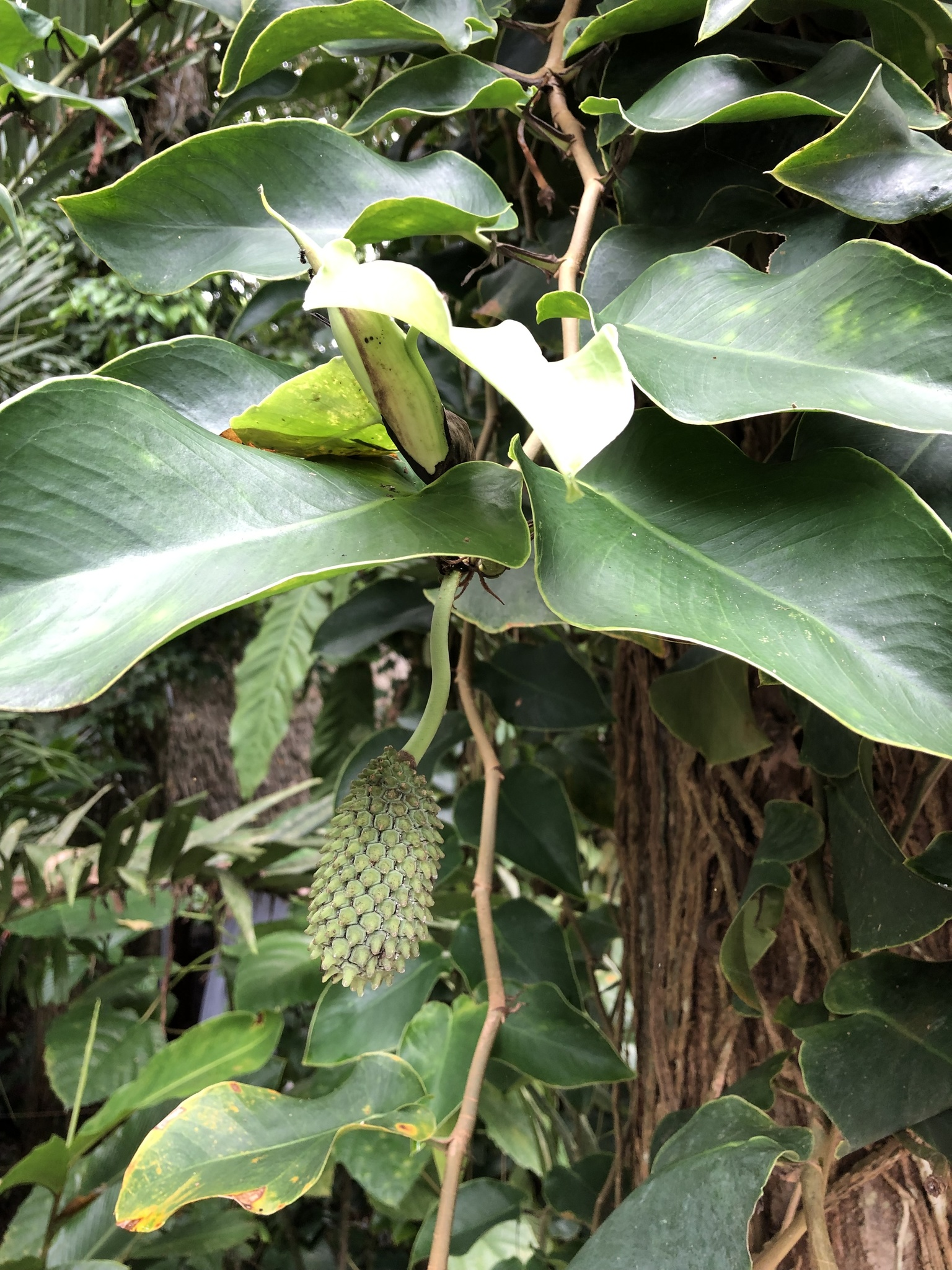
- M. tuberculata in Costa Rica, in fruit

Scientific classification
- Kingdom: Plantae
- Clade: Tracheophytes
- Clade: Angiosperms
- Clade: Monocots
- Order: Alismatales
- Family: Araceae
- Genus: Monstera
- Species: M. tuberculata

Binomial name
- Monstera tuberculata Lundell

= Monstera tuberculata =

Species of plant

Monstera tuberculata is a species of flowering plant in the family Araceae. It is sometimes referred to by the common names giant Monstera or giant velvet-leaf Monstera. It is native to Belize, Costa Rica, Guatemala, Southeast and Southwest Mexico, Nicaragua, Panama and Veracruz. It grows in lowland wet tropical biomes up to 200 metres (660 ft) in elevation. Similar to Monstera dubia and a few other species in its genus, when young M. tuberculata has a shingle-like growth habit with leaves tightly pressed against the trunks of trees. As it matures, it has short-stemmed, oval leaves that lack the fenestrations of better-known species like Monstera deliciosa. Unusually for an aroid, its fruit hangs like a pendant.

== Varieties ==
There are two named varieties of Monstera tuberculata, separated by region and with different fruit morphology.

- Monstera tuberculata var. brevinoda — from Nicaragua to Panama
- Monstera tuberculata var. tuberculata – Mexico and Belize
