= Monstera barrieri =

Scientific classification
- Kingdom: Plantae
- Clade: Tracheophytes
- Clade: Angiosperms
- Clade: Monocots
- Order: Alismatales
- Family: Araceae
- Genus: Monstera
- Species: M. barrieri

Binomial name
- Monstera barrieri Croat, Moonen & Poncy

Species of plant

Monstera barrieri is a flowering plant of the genus Monstera and family Araceae.

== Distribution ==
It is native to French Guiana.

== Description ==
It is a hemiepiphyte up to 10 meters in trees. Adult plants have an asymmetrical stem with diameter up to 2 cm internodes are shorter than they are broad, Petioles are 18–41 cm long. Blades are 36–58 cm long, and 31–37 cm wide.
