= Monstera kessleri =

Scientific classification
- Kingdom: Plantae
- Clade: Tracheophytes
- Clade: Angiosperms
- Clade: Monocots
- Order: Alismatales
- Family: Araceae
- Genus: Monstera
- Species: M. kessleri

Binomial name
- Monstera kessleri Croat, 2005

Species of plant

Monstera kessleri is a flowering plant in genus Monstera of the arum family Araceae.

== Distribution ==
It is native to Bolivia.
