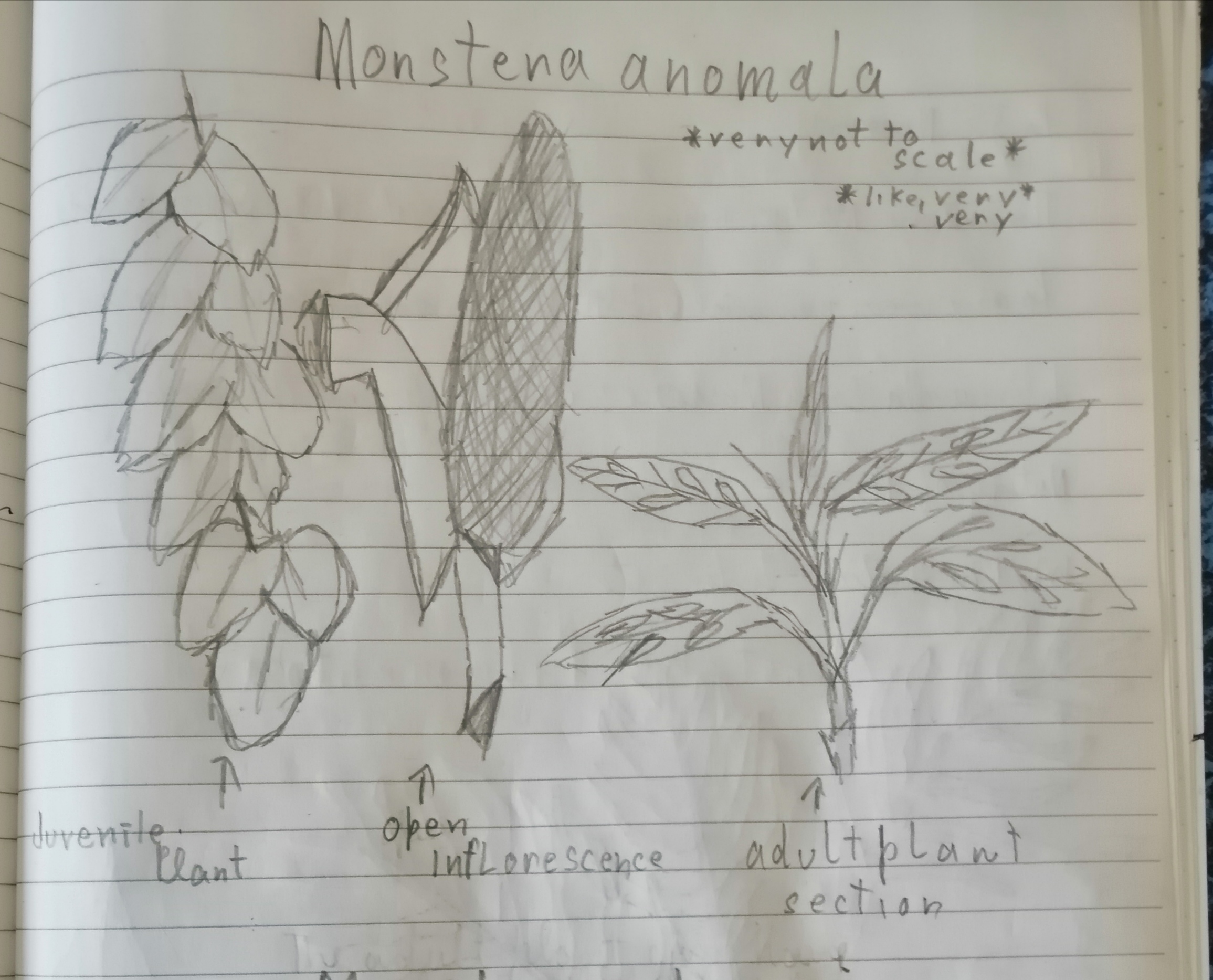

Scientific classification
- Kingdom: Plantae
- Clade: Tracheophytes
- Clade: Angiosperms
- Clade: Monocots
- Order: Alismatales
- Family: Araceae
- Genus: Monstera
- Species: M. anomala

Binomial name
- Monstera anomala Zuluaga & Croat

= Monstera anomala =

Species of flowering plant

Monstera anomala is a flowering plant of genus Monstera and family Araceae.
