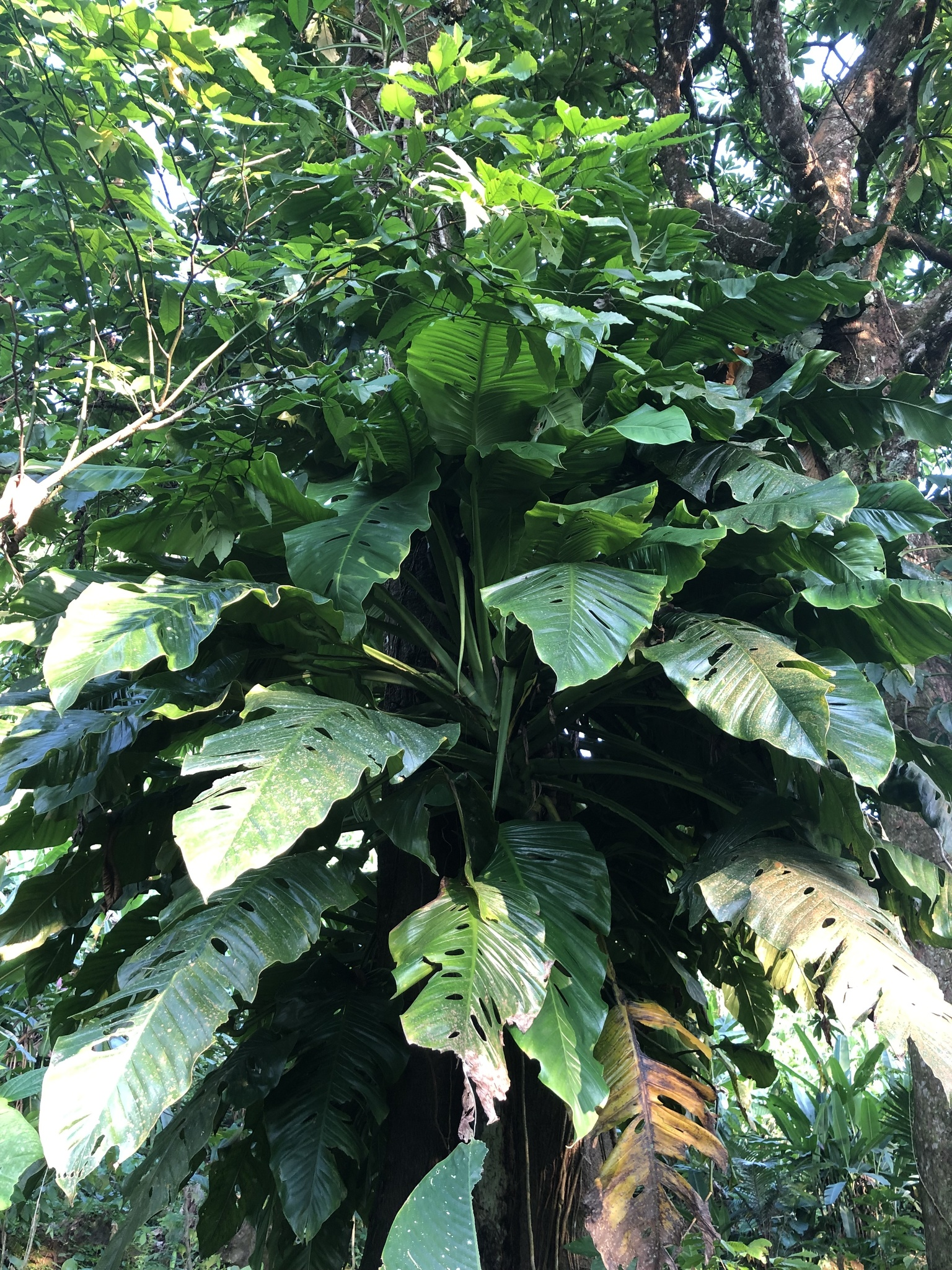
- M. egregia growing in Chiapas, Mexico

Scientific classification
- Kingdom: Plantae
- Clade: Tracheophytes
- Clade: Angiosperms
- Clade: Monocots
- Order: Alismatales
- Family: Araceae
- Genus: Monstera
- Species: M. egregia

Binomial name
- Monstera egregia Schott

= Monstera egregia =

Species of plant

Monstera egregia is a flowering plant belonging to genus Monstera of family Araceae.

== Distribution ==
It is native from Central and S. Mexico to Belize.
