= Monstera integrifolia =

Scientific classification
- Kingdom: Plantae
- Clade: Tracheophytes
- Clade: Angiosperms
- Clade: Monocots
- Order: Alismatales
- Family: Araceae
- Genus: Monstera
- Species: M. integrifolia

Binomial name
- Monstera integrifolia Zuluaga & Croat

Species of flowering plant

Monstera integrifolia is a species of flowering plant in the genus Monstera in the arum family, Araceae.

== Distribution ==
Its native range is Costa Rica to Panama.
