= Monstera bocatorensis =

- A leaf of the monstera bocatorensis plant

Scientific classification
- Kingdom: Plantae
- Clade: Tracheophytes
- Clade: Angiosperms
- Clade: Monocots
- Order: Alismatales
- Family: Araceae
- Genus: Monstera
- Species: M. bocatorensis

Binomial name
- Monstera bocatorensis Croat. & M.Cedeño

Flowering plant

Monstera bocatorensis is a flowering plant in the genus Monstera of family Araceae.

== Distribution ==
It is native to Panamá.
