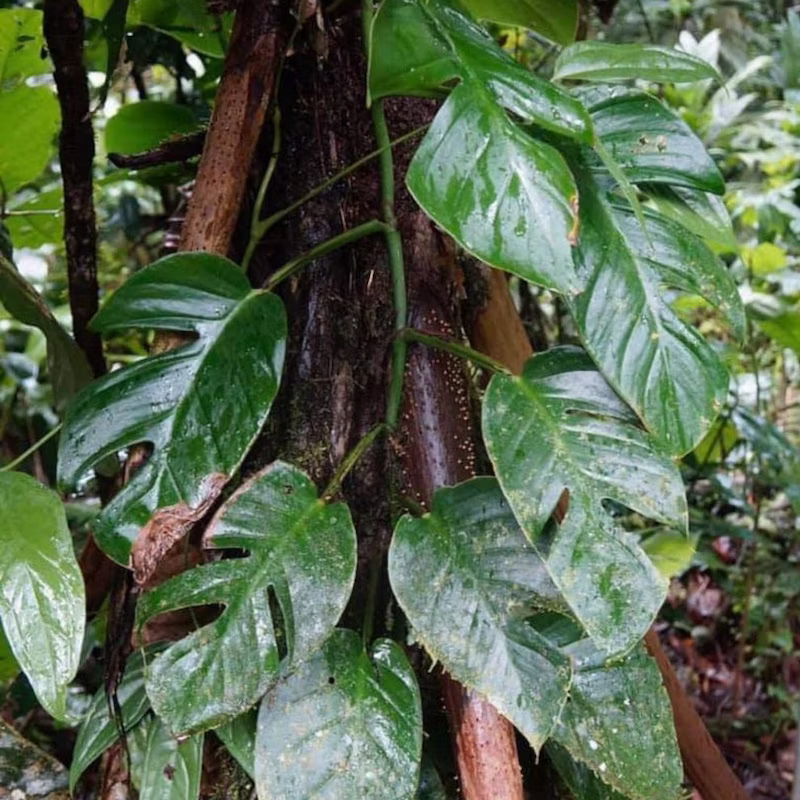

Scientific classification
- Kingdom: Plantae
- Clade: Tracheophytes
- Clade: Angiosperms
- Clade: Monocots
- Order: Alismatales
- Family: Araceae
- Genus: Monstera
- Species: M. glaucescens

Binomial name
- Monstera glaucescens Croat & Grayum

= Monstera glaucescens =

Species of plant

Monstera glaucescens is a flowering plant in genus Monstera of the arum family, Araceae.The native range of this species is Nicaragua to Colombia. It is a climber that grows primarily in wet tropical biomes.

== Distribution ==
It is native to South east Nicaragua to North west Colombia.
