= Gentlea vatteri =

Conservation status
- Data Deficient (IUCN 2.3)

Scientific classification
- Kingdom: Plantae
- Clade: Tracheophytes
- Clade: Angiosperms
- Clade: Eudicots
- Clade: Asterids
- Order: Ericales
- Family: Primulaceae
- Genus: Gentlea
- Species: G. vatteri

Binomial name
- Gentlea vatteri (Standley & Steyerm.) Lundell

Species of flowering plant

Gentlea vatteri is a species of plant in the family Primulaceae. It is found in El Salvador and Guatemala. It is threatened by habitat loss.
