= Monstera maderaverde =

Scientific classification
- Kingdom: Plantae
- Clade: Tracheophytes
- Clade: Angiosperms
- Clade: Monocots
- Order: Alismatales
- Family: Araceae
- Genus: Monstera
- Species: M. maderaverde

Binomial name
- Monstera maderaverde Grayum & Karney

Species of flowering plant

Monstera maderaverde is a species of flowering plant in the genus Monstera in the arum family, Araceae. Its native range is Honduras.
