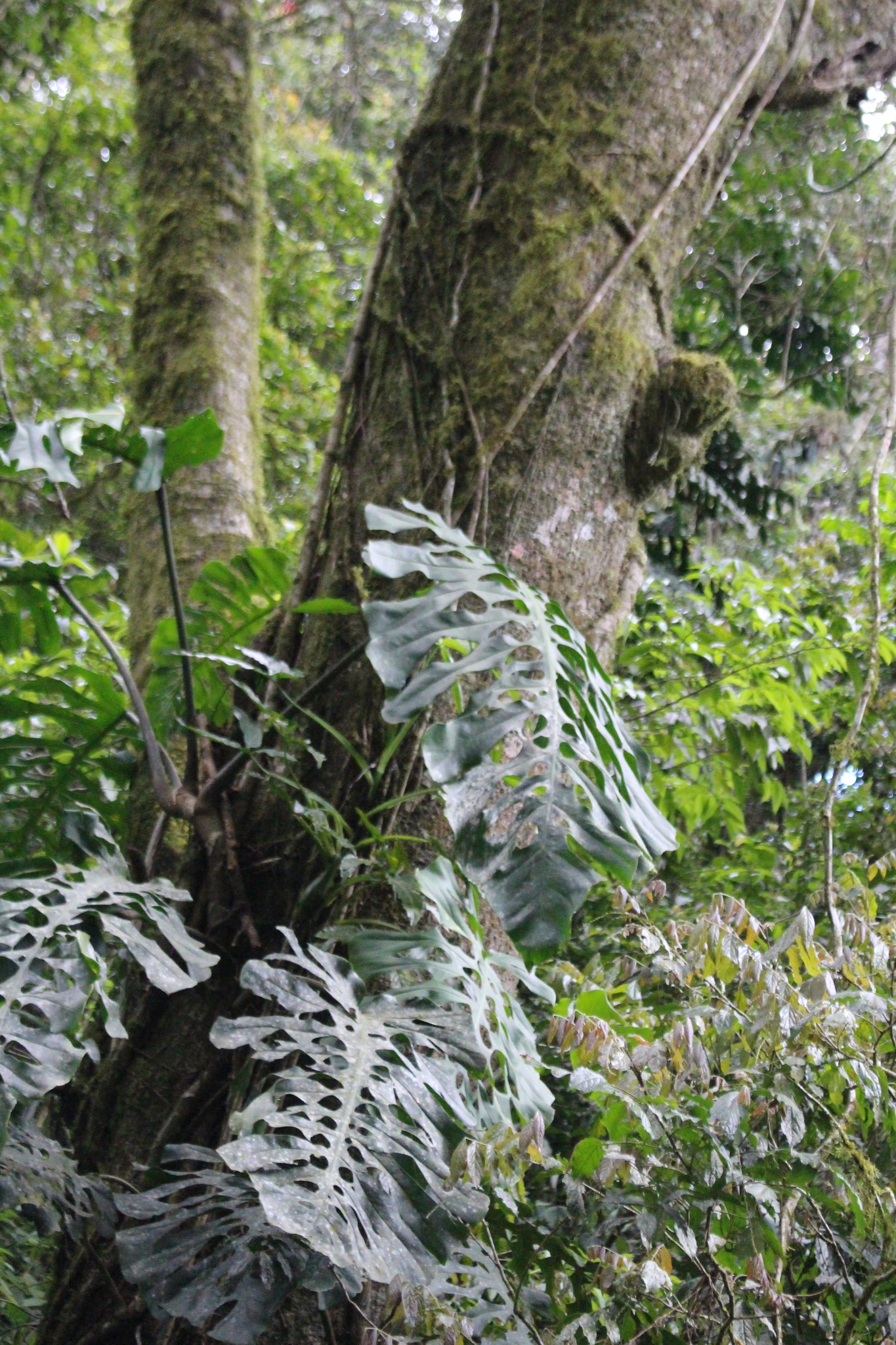
- In Costa Rica

Scientific classification
- Kingdom: Plantae
- Clade: Tracheophytes
- Clade: Angiosperms
- Clade: Monocots
- Order: Alismatales
- Family: Araceae
- Genus: Monstera
- Species: M. punctulata

Binomial name
- Monstera punctulata (Schott) Schott ex Engl.

Synonyms
- Anadendrum punctulatum Schott

= Monstera punctulata =

Species of flowering plant

Monstera punctulata is a species of flowering plant from the family Araceae found in the southern part of Mexico and in Central America.

== Description ==
The species is 15 metres (49 ft) tall. Juvenile have a flattened stem, while adult stem is brown in colour and is 3–4 centimetres (1.2–1.6 in). It is also tuberculate and subterete and have 3–6 centimetres (1.2–2.4 in) long internodes. The species petiole is either smooth or tuberculate, and can also be densely flecked with white spots which are 30–55 centimetres (12–22 in) long. They are also vaginate to the geniculum with its deciduous sheath wings, which sometimes are fibrous at the base of the petiole. It geniculum is 3–4 centimetres (1.2–1.6 in) long and is often of a rough texture and dark brown in colour. The species have a bright green coloured lamina that is soft in texture and is not glossy. It trichosclereids is absent and is 60–120 centimetres (24–47 in) long by 35–60 centimetres (14–24 in) wide. It also has a peduncle which is terete, tuberculate and is 1.5–2.5 centimetres (0.59–0.98 in) thick and 14–18 centimetres (5.5–7.1 in) long. The species spathe is white in colour, is obovate, and is 15–18 centimetres (5.9–7.1 in) tall. It is also blunt or shortly mucronate with flowering spadix being deep green to greenish gold coloured and is 14–19 centimetres (5.5–7.5 in) long and 3.5–5.5 centimetres (1.4–2.2 in) thick.

== Distribution and ecology ==
It is found in such Central American countries as Belize, Costa Rica, and Panama. In central Petén, Guatemala it is found growing on limestone.
