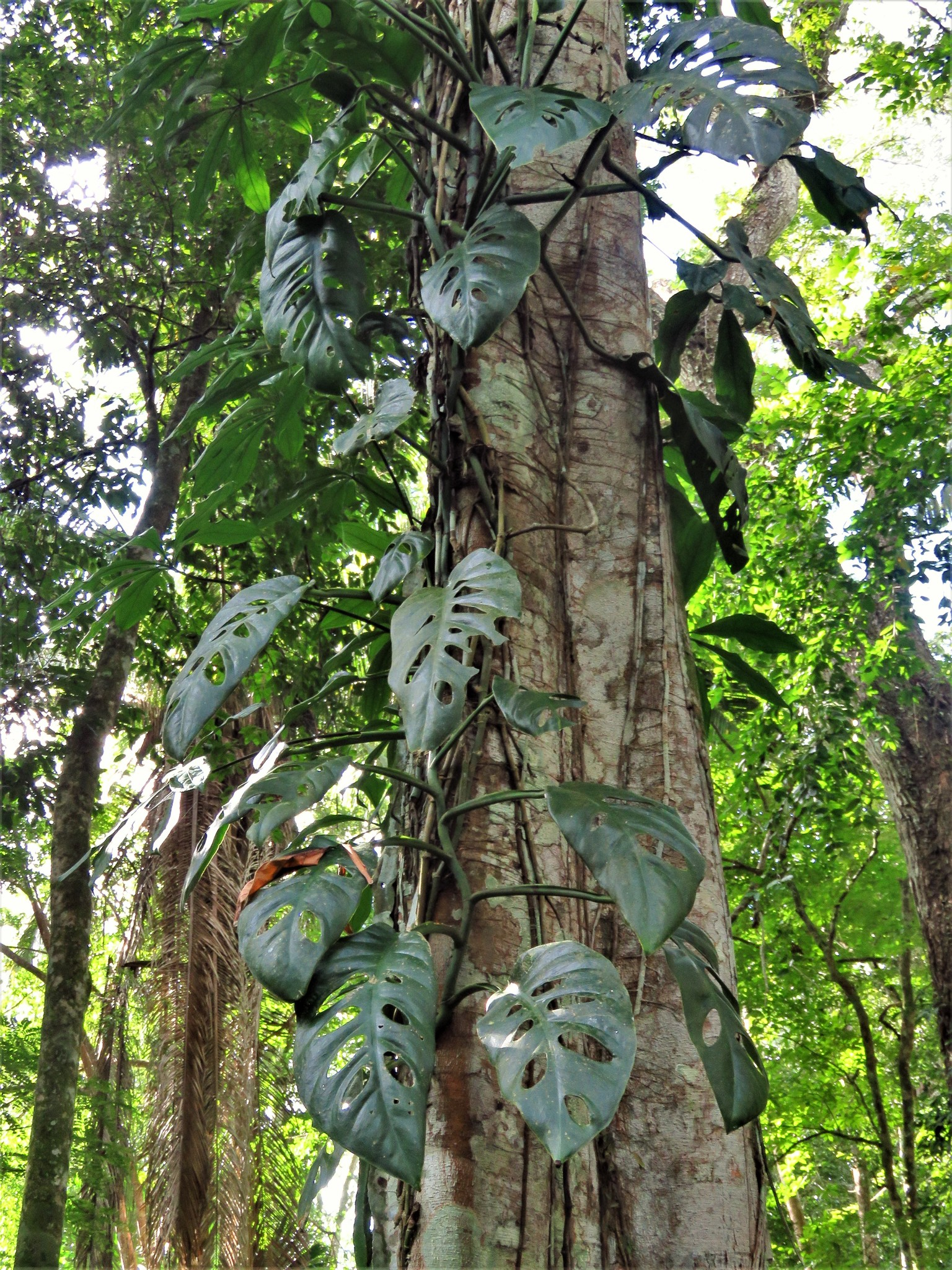
- Near La Milpa in Belize

Scientific classification
- Kingdom: Plantae
- Clade: Tracheophytes
- Clade: Angiosperms
- Clade: Monocots
- Order: Alismatales
- Family: Araceae
- Genus: Monstera
- Species: M. acuminata

Binomial name
- Monstera acuminata K.Koch

Synonyms
- Monstera belizensis Lundell; Monstera chiapensis Matuda; Monstera dimidiata Schott; Monstera grandifolia Standl. & Steyerm.; Monstera karwinskyi Schott; Monstera viridispatha Matuda

= Monstera acuminata =

Species of flowering plant

Monstera acuminata, or shingle plant, is a species of flowering plant in the family Araceae which is widespread from Mexico to Central America. It is abundant in central Petén and extends north to San Luis Potosí, making it the northernmost species of Monstera.

== Description ==
Monstera acuminata germinates in the ground and grows horizontally as a low prostrate herb. The juvenile plant is much smaller and heart-shaped with thick, roundish, waxy leaves which grow in two ranks and overlap each other with the stem elliptic in cross section and internodes 1–5 cm long and asymmetric leaves.

When it encounters a tree trunk, it uses its ageotropic anchoring roots to grow vertically. The adult plant appears similar to that of Monstera deliciosa and these leaves are developed when the plant reaches 15 feet and is an example of dimorphism. The leaves are smooth or papillose stem 2–3.5 cm thick with internodes 6–11 cm long. After it grows upwards, the base of the stem of the hemiepiphyte dies and rots, thereby losing its connection to the soil.
