= Monstera aureopinnata =

Scientific classification
- Kingdom: Plantae
- Clade: Tracheophytes
- Clade: Angiosperms
- Clade: Monocots
- Order: Alismatales
- Family: Araceae
- Genus: Monstera
- Species: M. aureopinnata

Binomial name
- Monstera aureopinnata Croat

Species of flowering plant

Monstera aureopinnata is a flowering plant in genus Monstera of family Araceae. It is an epiphyte.

== Distribution ==
It is native to Colombia, Ecuador, and Peru.
