= Monstera luteynii =

Scientific classification
- Kingdom: Plantae
- Clade: Tracheophytes
- Clade: Angiosperms
- Clade: Monocots
- Order: Alismatales
- Family: Araceae
- Genus: Monstera
- Species: M. luteynii

Binomial name
- Monstera luteynii Madison

Species of flowering plant

Monstera luteynii is a species of flowering plant in the genus Monstera of the arum family, Araceae.

== Distribution ==
Its native range is Costa Rica.
