= Monstera cenepensis =

Scientific classification
- Kingdom: Plantae
- Clade: Tracheophytes
- Clade: Angiosperms
- Clade: Monocots
- Order: Alismatales
- Family: Araceae
- Genus: Monstera
- Species: M. cenepensis

Binomial name
- Monstera cenepensis Croat

Species of flowering plant

Monstera cenepensis is a species of flowering plants in the family Araceae.

== Description ==
Hemiepiphytic with short internodes of 1.2 cm diam. Petioles are 48 cm long. Blades ovate, 43.5 × 18.5 cm.

== Range ==
The native range of Monstera cenepensis is north Peru.
