= Monstera gigas =

Scientific classification
- Kingdom: Plantae
- Clade: Tracheophytes
- Clade: Angiosperms
- Clade: Monocots
- Order: Alismatales
- Family: Araceae
- Genus: Monstera
- Species: M. gigas

Binomial name
- Monstera gigas Croat, Zuluaga, M.Cedeño & O.Ortiz

Species of flowering plant

Monstera gigas is a species of flowering plants in the genus Monstera, of the arum family, Araceae.

== Distribution ==
It is native to Panama.

== Description ==
Monstera gigas is the largest species of Monstera. It can grow to 100 ft (30 m) in height and produces leaves that can get to 9 ft (2.7 m). This species was so tall that researchers nearly missed it due to its lofty height, and its foliage resembles the plant, Rhodospatha wendlandii.
