= Monstera guzmanjacobiae =

Scientific classification
- Kingdom: Plantae
- Clade: Tracheophytes
- Clade: Angiosperms
- Clade: Monocots
- Order: Alismatales
- Family: Araceae
- Genus: Monstera
- Species: M. guzmanjacobiae

Binomial name
- Monstera guzmanjacobiae Diaz Jim., M.Cedeño, Zuluaga & Aguilar-Rodr. in Díaz Jiménez et al., 2020

Species of plant

Monstera guzmanjacobiae is a species of plant in the family Araceae from Mexico.

== Distribution ==
It is endemic to the Los Tuxtlas region in Veracruz, Mexico.

== Description ==
Monstera guzmanjacobiae is a hemi-epiphytic herb that can reach 25 m (82 ft) above the ground.
