= Monstera boliviana =

Scientific classification
- Kingdom: Plantae
- Clade: Tracheophytes
- Clade: Angiosperms
- Clade: Monocots
- Order: Alismatales
- Family: Araceae
- Genus: Monstera
- Species: M. boliviana

Binomial name
- Monstera boliviana Rusby

Species of plant

Monstera boliviana is a flowering plant belonging to genus Monstera of family Araceae.

== Distribution ==
It is native to Bolivia and Peru.
