= Gentlea =

Scientific classification
- Kingdom: Plantae
- Clade: Tracheophytes
- Clade: Angiosperms
- Clade: Eudicots
- Clade: Asterids
- Order: Ericales
- Family: Primulaceae
- Subfamily: Myrsinoideae
- Genus: Gentlea; Lundell

Genus of flowering plants

Gentlea is a genus of plant in family Primulaceae named for botanical explorer Percy H. Gentle of Belize Town, British Honduras. It contains the following species (but this list may be incomplete):

- Gentlea molinae Lundell
- Gentlea vatteri (Standley & Steyerm.) Lundell
