= Philodendron opacum =

Scientific classification
- Kingdom: Plantae
- Clade: Tracheophytes
- Clade: Angiosperms
- Clade: Monocots
- Order: Alismatales
- Family: Araceae
- Genus: Philodendron
- Species: P. opacum

Binomial name
- Philodendron opacum Croat & Grayum
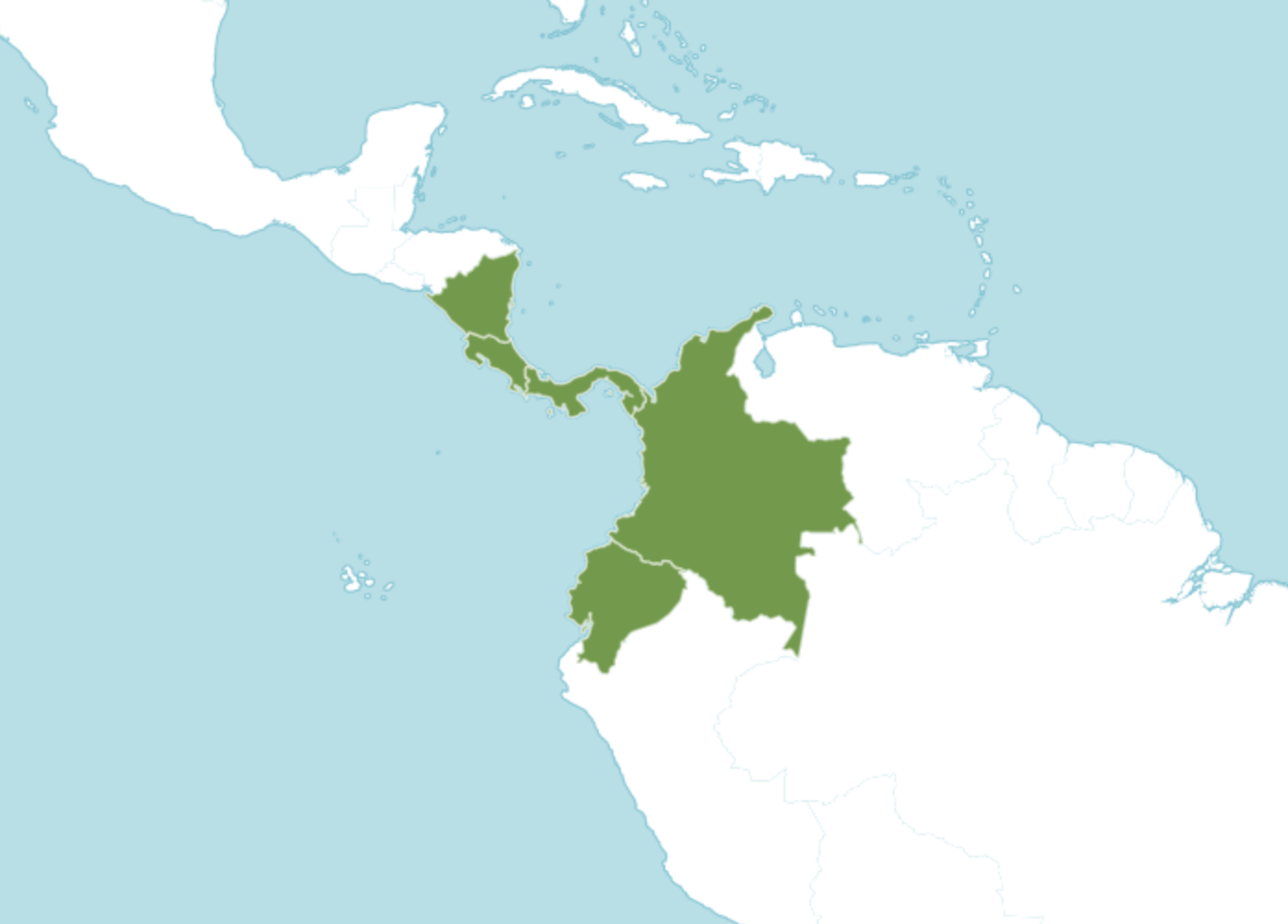
- Range

Synonyms
- List: Monstera karstenianum

Species of flowering plant

Philodendron opacum is a species of flowering plant in the family Araceae. It has a native range extending from Southeast Nicaragua to Ecuador and includes Colombia, Costa Rica, Ecuador, Nicaragua, Panama. Its habitat is largely restricted to the Tropical Wet Forest and Premontane Wet Forest life zones in Central America, but in South America extends into Premontane Rain Forest (Colombia) and Tropical Moist Forest (Ecuador).

It is sold and grown as a houseplant often under the common names Monstera sp. 'Peru' and Green Galaxy Monstera, but may also be seen listed as Monstera karstenianum or Epipremnum pinnatum 'Marble Planet'; E. pinnatum is an accepted species by the Royal Botanic Gardens Kew though refers to a different plant entirely. If intended to be grown outdoors in the United States, a region outside its native range, it is recommended it be grown in USDA Hardiness Zones 10–12.

The species opacum is named from the Latin word for "dark", "dull", or "shade".

== Description ==
This member of the arum family (Araceae) has been described as both an epiphyte and hemiepiphyte that exhibits an upward vining growth habit.

=== Leaves ===
The lamina surface is classically dark green or gray-green in color, though varieties with yellow variegations exist, ranging from 17.7 to 43.4 cm long and 7.8 to 18.8 cm wide. The texture of the lamina surface has been described as thinly coriaceous to subcoriaceous, matte or velvety to semiglossy in appearance. The coloration of the underside may be weakly to conspicuously bicolored (yellow-green) and appear matte to semiglossy. Leaf shape has been described as having considerable variability including: Narrowly to broadly ovate, broadly or ± narrowly lanceolate, elliptic, and oblong or broadly oblanceolate (usually broadest below the middle). The leaf attaches to the stem via a 16.6–29.5 cm long petiole.

== See also ==
- List of Philodendron species
