= Monstera alcirana =

Scientific classification
- Kingdom: Plantae
- Clade: Tracheophytes
- Clade: Angiosperms
- Clade: Monocots
- Order: Alismatales
- Family: Araceae
- Genus: Monstera
- Species: M. alcirana

Binomial name
- Monstera alcirana Croat, M. Cedeño, Zuluaga & O. Ortiz

Species of plant

Monstera alcirana is a species of plant in the family Araceae. It was named after Alcira Pérez de Gómez, a Venezuelan biologist. Monstera alcirana is endemic to the provinces of Coclé, Panamá, Colón and Veraguas in Panama, at 350–1000 metres of elevation. It prefers to live in tropical wet forests and rain forests. The plant flowers January–April and fruiting January–May.
