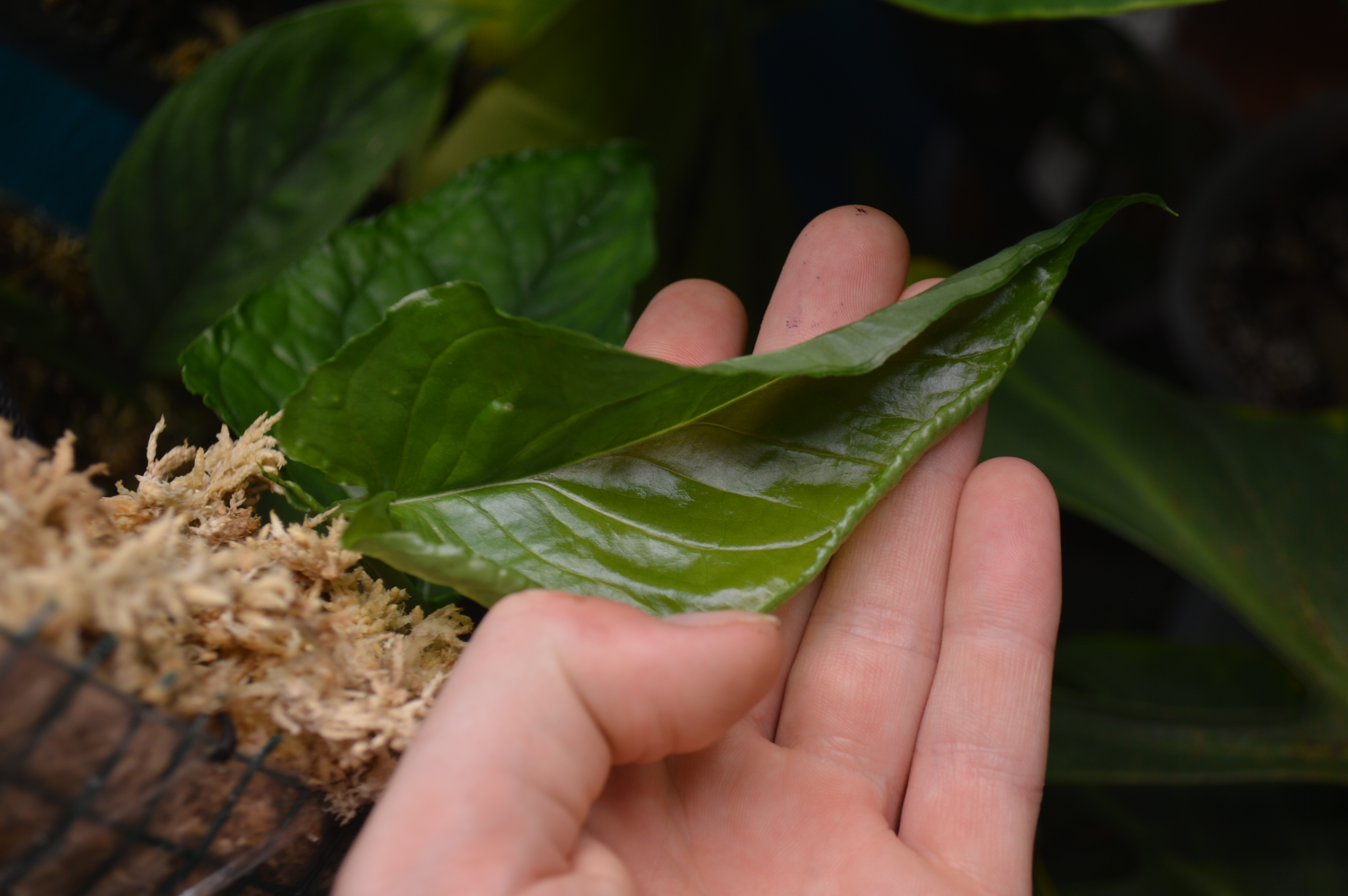

Scientific classification
- Kingdom: Plantae
- Clade: Tracheophytes
- Clade: Angiosperms
- Clade: Monocots
- Order: Alismatales
- Family: Araceae
- Genus: Monstera
- Species: M. membranacea

Binomial name
- Monstera membranacea Madison

= Monstera membranacea =

Species of plant

Monstera membranacea is a species of flowering plant in the genus Monstera of the arum family, Araceae.

== Description ==
The lamina is very thin and membranaceous. The spathe runs down the flower stalk for 3–8 cm (1.2–3.1 in). The fruit is green with the style portion falling off to show the seeds within a bright orange pulp. The seeds are spherical, with the S-shaped ridge forming a bump on the surface.

== Distribution ==
it is native to Costa Rica and west Panama.
