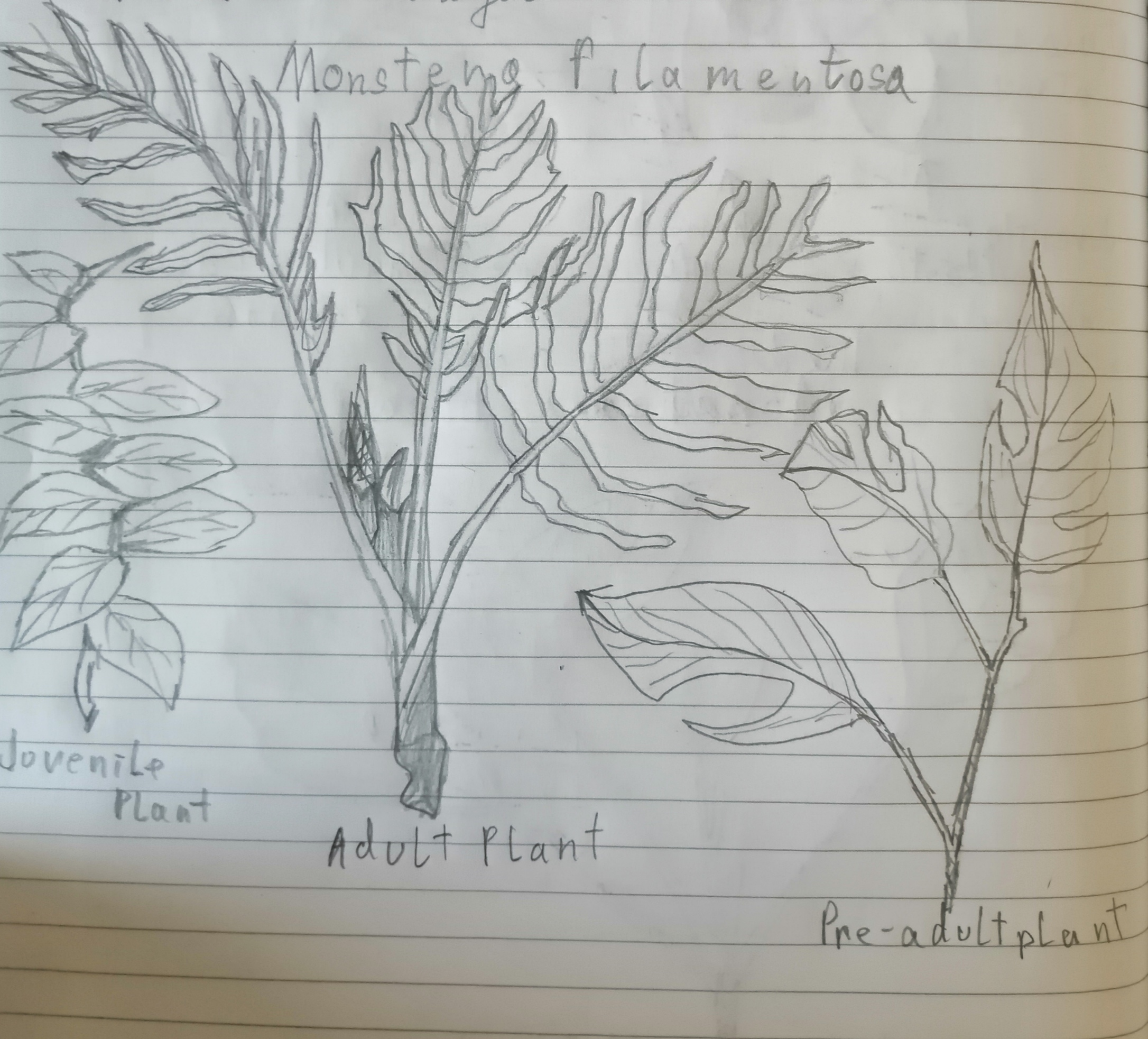

Scientific classification
- Kingdom: Plantae
- Clade: Embryophytes
- Clade: Tracheophytes
- Clade: Spermatophytes
- Clade: Angiosperms
- Clade: Monocots
- Order: Alismatales
- Family: Araceae
- Genus: Monstera
- Species: M. filamentosa

Binomial name
- Monstera filamentosa Croat & Grayum

= Monstera filamentosa =

Species of plant

Monstera filamentosa is a flowering plant in the genus Monstera and family Araceae.

It is known for its highly fenestrated leaves.

== Distribution ==
It is native to Costa Rica, Panama, and Colombia.
