= Monstera florescanoana =

Scientific classification
- Kingdom: Plantae
- Clade: Tracheophytes
- Clade: Angiosperms
- Clade: Monocots
- Order: Alismatales
- Family: Araceae
- Genus: Monstera
- Species: M. florescanoana

Binomial name
- Monstera florescanoana Croat, T.Krömer & Acebey

Species of plant

Monstera florescanoana is a flowering plant in genus Monstera and family Araceae.

== Distribution ==
It is native to Mexico (Veracruz).
