= Monstera limitaris =

Scientific classification
- Kingdom: Plantae
- Clade: Tracheophytes
- Clade: Angiosperms
- Clade: Monocots
- Order: Alismatales
- Family: Araceae
- Genus: Monstera
- Species: M. limitaris

Binomial name
- Monstera limitaris M.Cedeño

Species of plant

Monstera limitaris is a flowering plant in the genus Monstera of the arum family (Araceae).

== Distribution ==
It is Native to Costa Rica and Panama.
