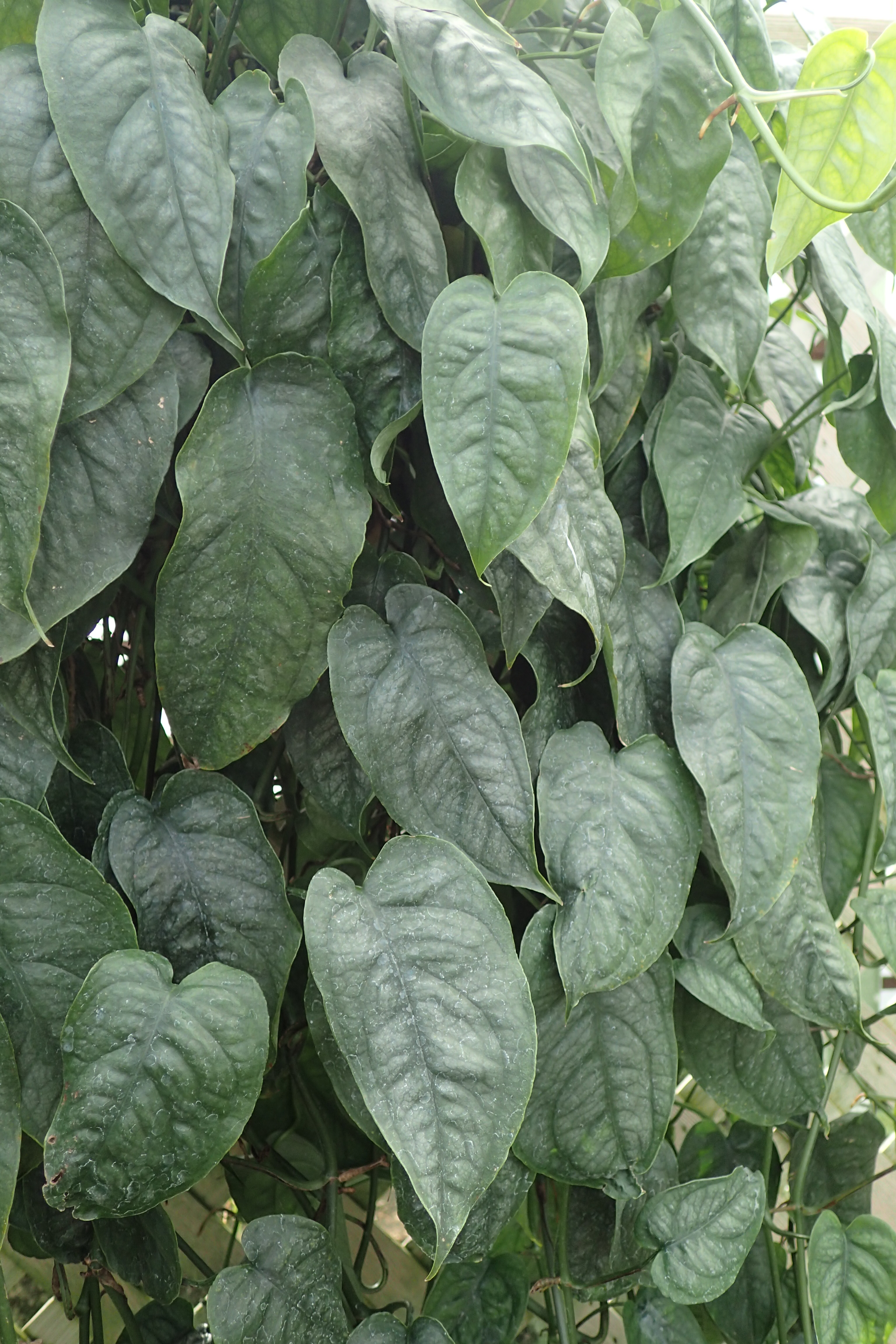
- M. siltepecana at the Lincoln Park Conservatory

Scientific classification
- Kingdom: Plantae
- Clade: Tracheophytes
- Clade: Angiosperms
- Clade: Monocots
- Order: Alismatales
- Family: Araceae
- Genus: Monstera
- Species: M. siltepecana

Binomial name
- Monstera siltepecana Matuda

= Monstera siltepecana =

Species of plant

Monstera siltepecana is a species of flowering plant in the genus Monstera native to the wet tropical biomes of southern Mexico and Central America. Like other Monstera species, it is a vining plant and as it matures, develops holes in its leaves. Especially in immature foliage, it has distinctive silver venation. The monstera siltepecana is a very fast growing plant along with the other arum family members.
