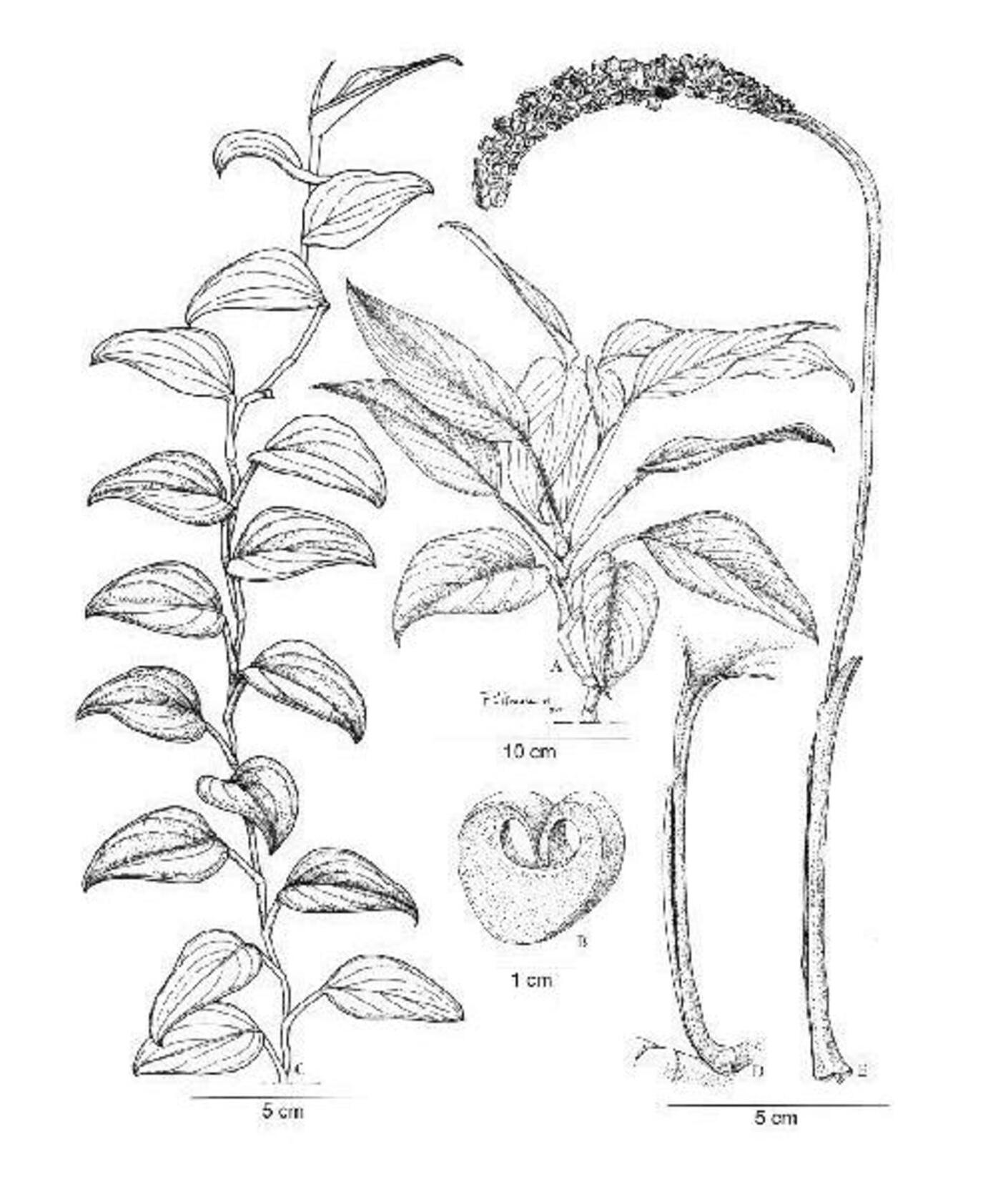
- Adult plant without perforations (A), a juvenile with a sheath and wings (C), a cross section of the petiole showing sheath wings (B), and a mature inflorescence with cataphylls at the base (E)

Scientific classification
- Kingdom: Plantae
- Clade: Tracheophytes
- Clade: Angiosperms
- Clade: Monocots
- Order: Alismatales
- Family: Araceae
- Genus: Monstera
- Species: M. gambensis

Binomial name
- Monstera gambensis M.Cedeño & M.A.Blanco

= Monstera gambensis =

Species of plant

Monstera gambensis is a species of plant in the family Araceae. It is endemic to the tropical forest of La Gamba, Golfito, Costa Rica, at 100 m (330 ft) elevation. They can be found on the floor of humid forests with their stems climbing up trees and aerial roots visible above the soil. Sometimes the entire plant can be found solely on trees. M. gambensis is typically not fenestrated until the adult stage, but can have two perforations on their blade.

== Growth ==
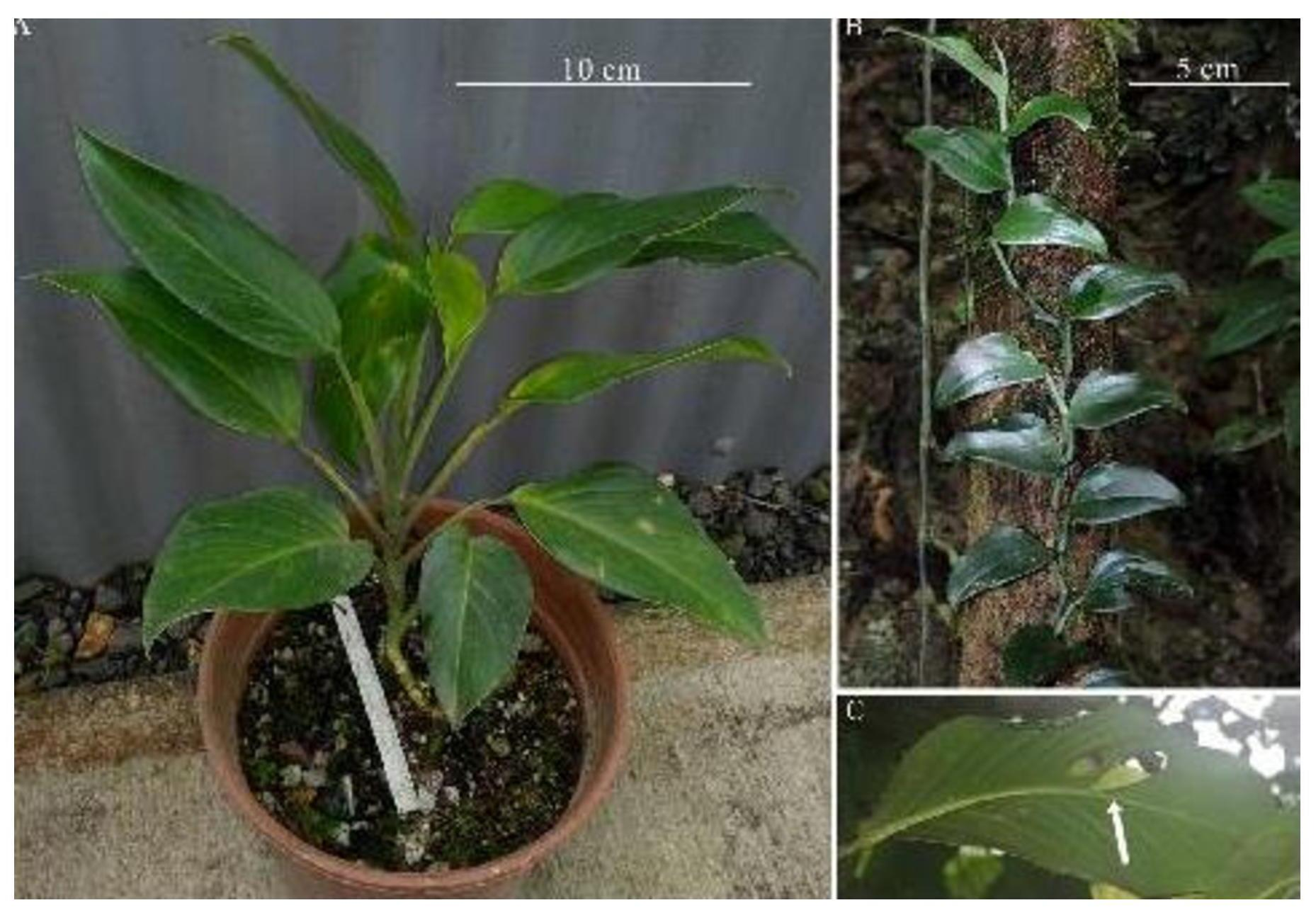
This image shows a picture in three different parts: one with the view of the full plant, one with the vining monstera growing up a tree, and the last with fenstrations.

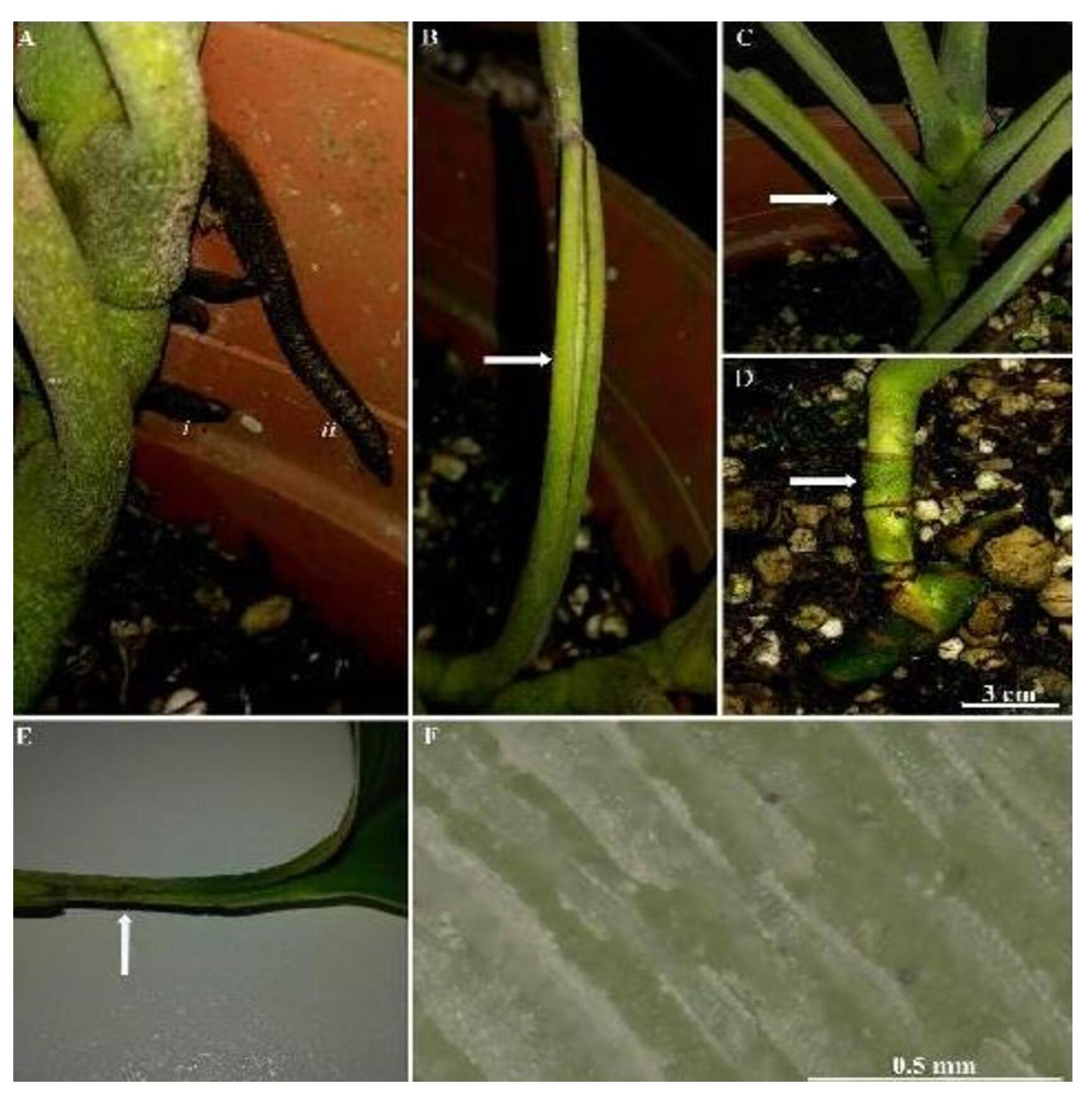
This image shows the support and feeding root which are both corky and black (A), a petiole sheath in and adult plant (B), petioles with sheath margins (C), internodes in the adult plant (D), the shallow distal portion of the petiole (E), and the dead epidermis that gives the plant a white appearance in color and an asperous texture to the surface of the petioles (F).

M. gambensis starts off as seedlings which then grow into juvenile plants capable of appressed-climbing. The stems are dark green in color with internodes that are 3–5 cm (1.2–2.0 in) long, and their petioles are visible with either a dark or light green color. M. gambensis leaves bend to face the sun. The leaf blades are neither horizontal nor flat so that it is able to grow on another plant, and they are rarely varigated.

Adult M. gambensis are appressed-climbers with dark green stems, similar lengths of internodes and unchanged color of petioles, but in this mature stage, their corky roots have black hairs and the leaf blades are bigger. Adult M. gambensis can have fenestrations. M. gambensis's roots are photosynthetic and can coil on the ground or wrap around a tree. Its roots can be scattered along the stems that are less compact, giving more room to grow. Root lengths depends on their closeness to the original center of the host; the closest roots are longer. The shape of the leaves help them catch rainwater that falls off of the host plant, and it also gets nutrients from leaf-litter.

== Ecology ==
M. gambensis is a hemiepiphyte, which means that it spends a part of its lifecycle as an epiphyte. M. gambensis can develop a pseudotrunk that allows it to outgrow its host. The plants aerial roots may either go into the soil or spread along the ground. As an epiphyte, M. gambensis is benefited but its host is neither benefited nor harmed, as is true for all non-parasitic epiphytes.

== Reproduction ==
Pollination of M. gambensis typically happens via Trigona, beetle, or fly. Beetles are attracted to the inflorescence of M. gambensis flowers where they mate and eat the flower, its tissue, or the pollen grains. Similar to beetle pollination, flies visit the inflorescence on the flower so they can mate and deposit eggs. The adult flies eat the stigmatic secretions or pollen grains, while the larvae eat the decomposing parts of the flower. These insect-based pollinations maintain genetic diversity.
