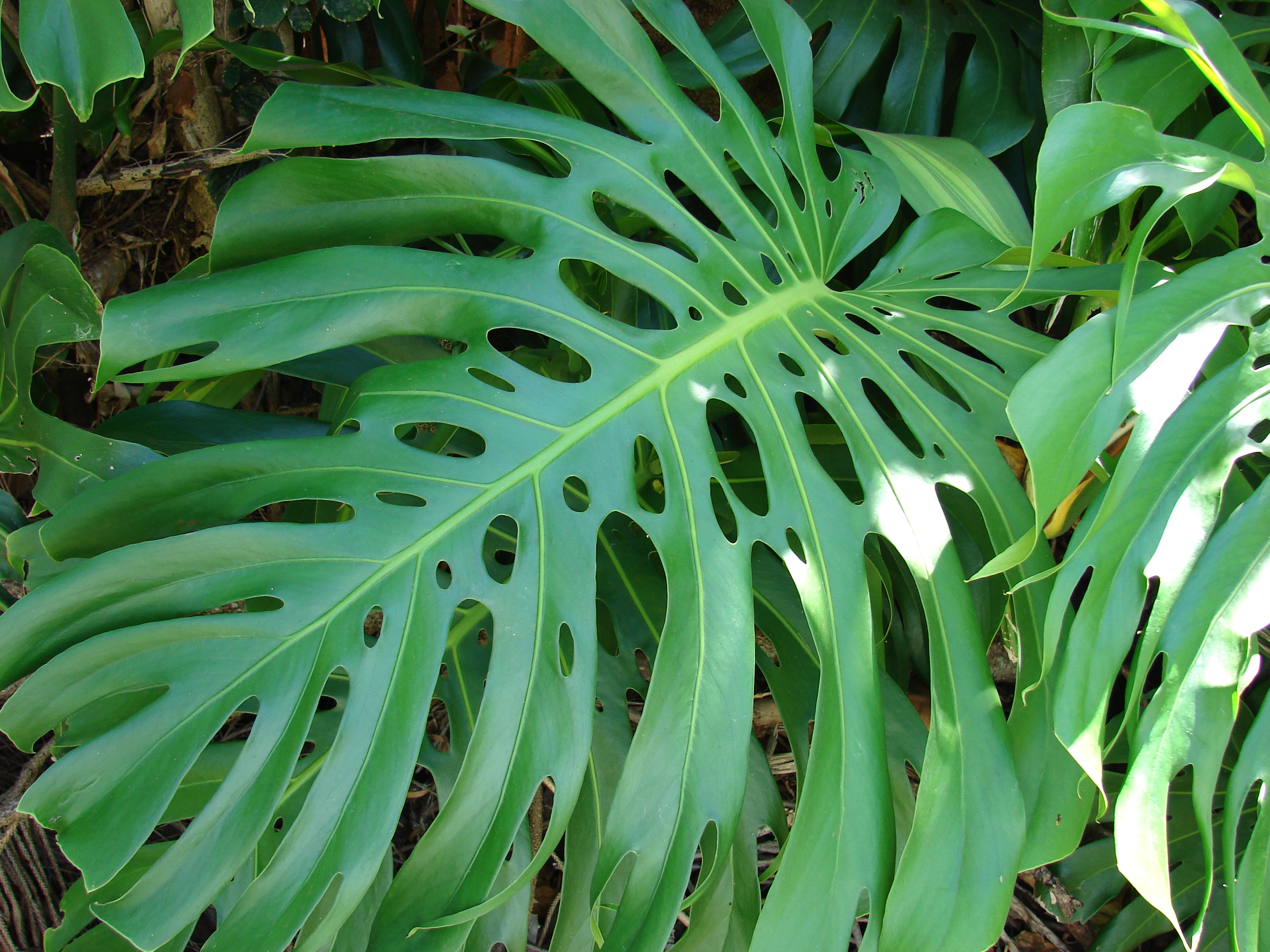
- Monstera deliciosa

Scientific classification
- Kingdom: Plantae
- Clade: Tracheophytes
- Clade: Angiosperms
- Clade: Monocots
- Order: Alismatales
- Family: Araceae
- Subfamily: Monsteroideae
- Tribe: Monstereae
- Genus: Monstera; Adans.

Synonyms
- Tornelia Gutierrez ex Schott; Serangium Wood ex Salisb.

= Monstera =

Genus of flowering plants

Monstera is a genus of 59 species of flowering plants in the arum family, Araceae, native to tropical regions of central and south America.

== Etymology ==
The genus is named from the Latin word for "monstrous" or "abnormal", and refers to the unusual leaves with natural holes, or fenestrations (slits) and perforations (holes), that most members of the genus have.

== Description ==
=== Growth pattern ===
They are evergreen vines, growing to heights of 20 metres (66 ft) in trees, climbing by means of aerial roots which act as hooks over branches; these roots will also grow into the soil to help support the plant. Since plants in the genus root both into the soil and over trees, it is considered a hemiepiphyte with roots in soil but climbing on trees. Aerial roots hanging directly to the ground have, according to Madison, measured up to 30 m (98 ft) long.

=== Leaves ===
The leaves are alternate, leathery, dark green, very large, from 25–90 centimetres (9.8–35.4 in) long (up to 300 centimetres (120 in) long in M. gigas) and 15–75 centimetres (5.9–29.5 in) broad, often with holes in the leaf blade. The fenestrated leaves allow for the leaves to spread over greater area to increase sunlight exposure, and to allow light to reach other leaves below, by using less energy to produce and maintain the leaves.

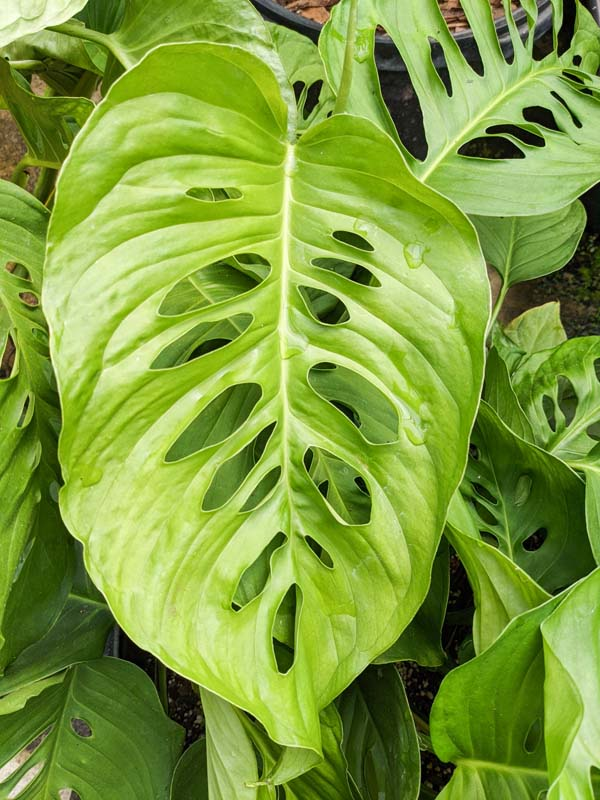
Monstera lechleriana leaf

=== Inflorescence ===
The flowers are borne on a specialized inflorescence called a spadix, 5–95 centimetres (2.0–37.4 in) long; the fruit is a cluster of berries, with significant variation in color, edible in some species.

== Cultivation and care ==
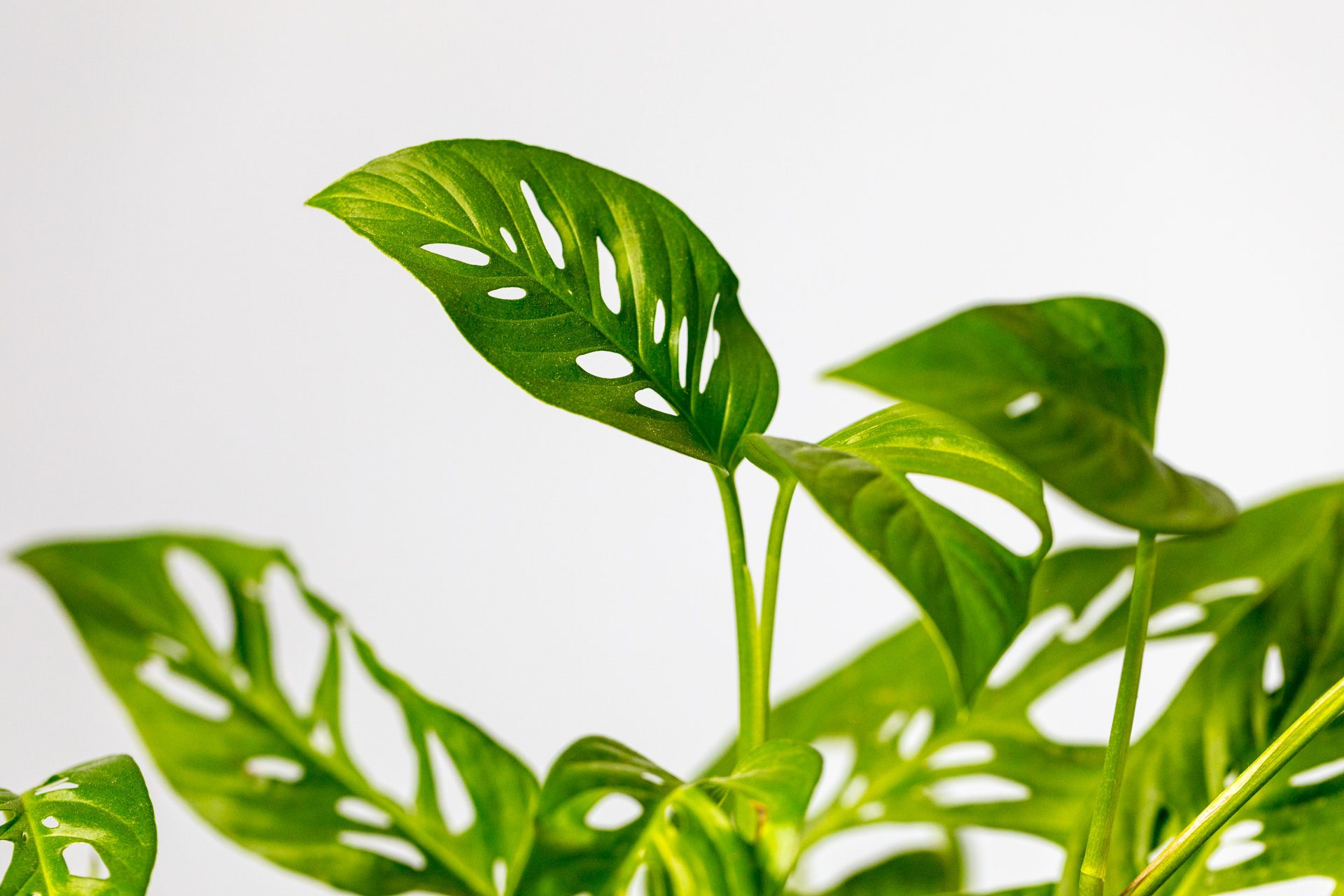
Monstera adansonii

Monsteras are widely cultivated as ornamental houseplants around the world for their large, decorative foliage and tolerance of indoor conditions. They thrive in bright, indirect light similar to the dappled sunlight of their native tropical forests. Direct sunlight can scorch the leaves, while low light may slow growth and reduce leaf splitting.

These plants prefer well-draining, aerated soil rich in organic matter, often containing components such as peat, perlite, or orchid bark. Watering should be moderate—allowing the top layer of soil to dry slightly between waterings helps prevent root rot. High humidity and warm temperatures between 18–29 °C (65–85 °F) encourage vigorous growth.

Regular pruning helps maintain shape, promotes larger leaves, and encourages new growth. Monsteras can be easily propagated from stem cuttings that include a node, which can root in water or soil under bright, indirect light. Fertilizing during the growing season with a balanced houseplant fertilizer supports healthy foliage and consistent growth.

Indoors, Monsteras are often trained to climb moss poles or trellises, mimicking their natural growth habit in tropical forests. With suitable care, they can live for many years and become a prominent feature in interior spaces.

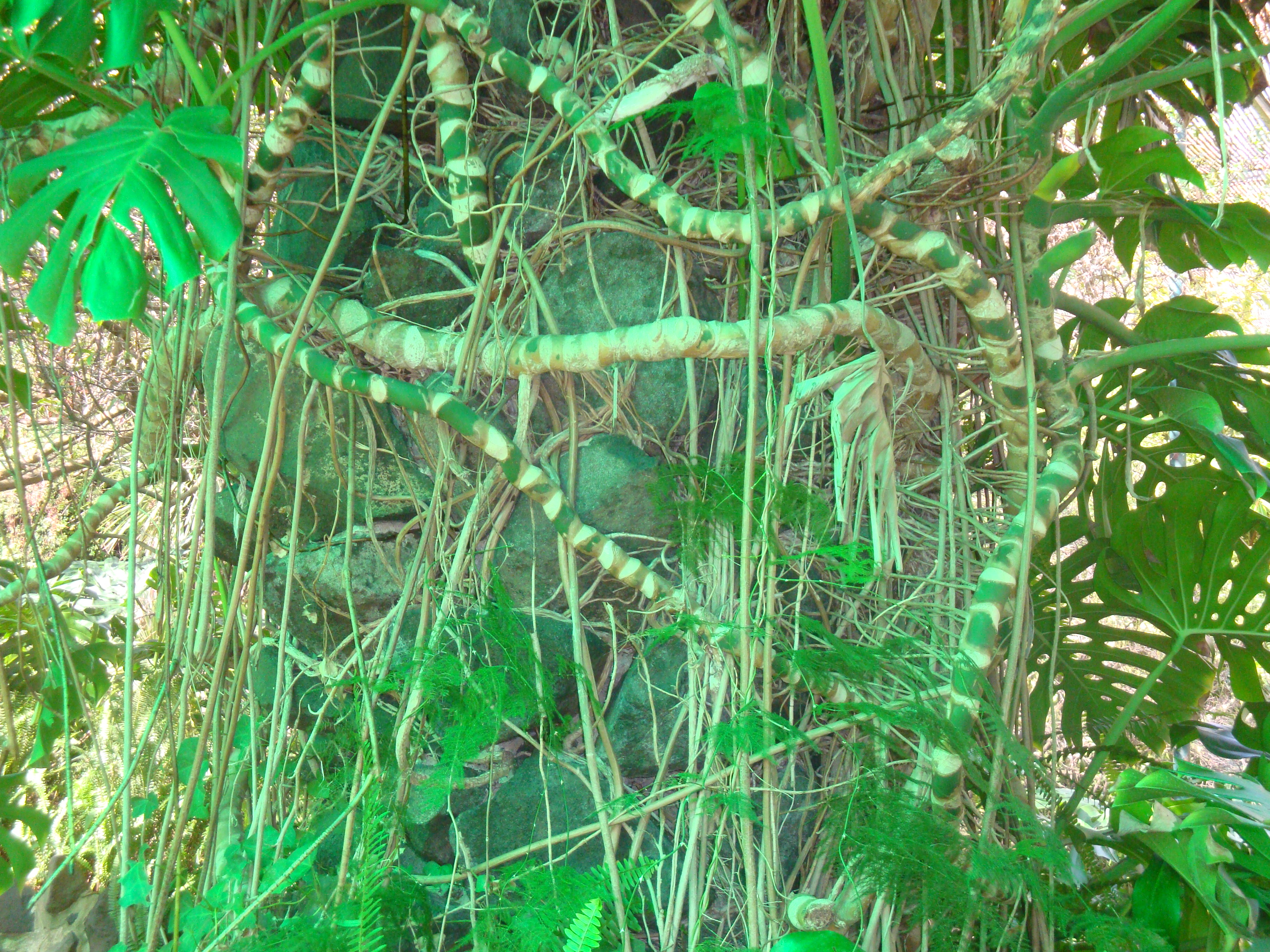
Monstera deliciosa vine

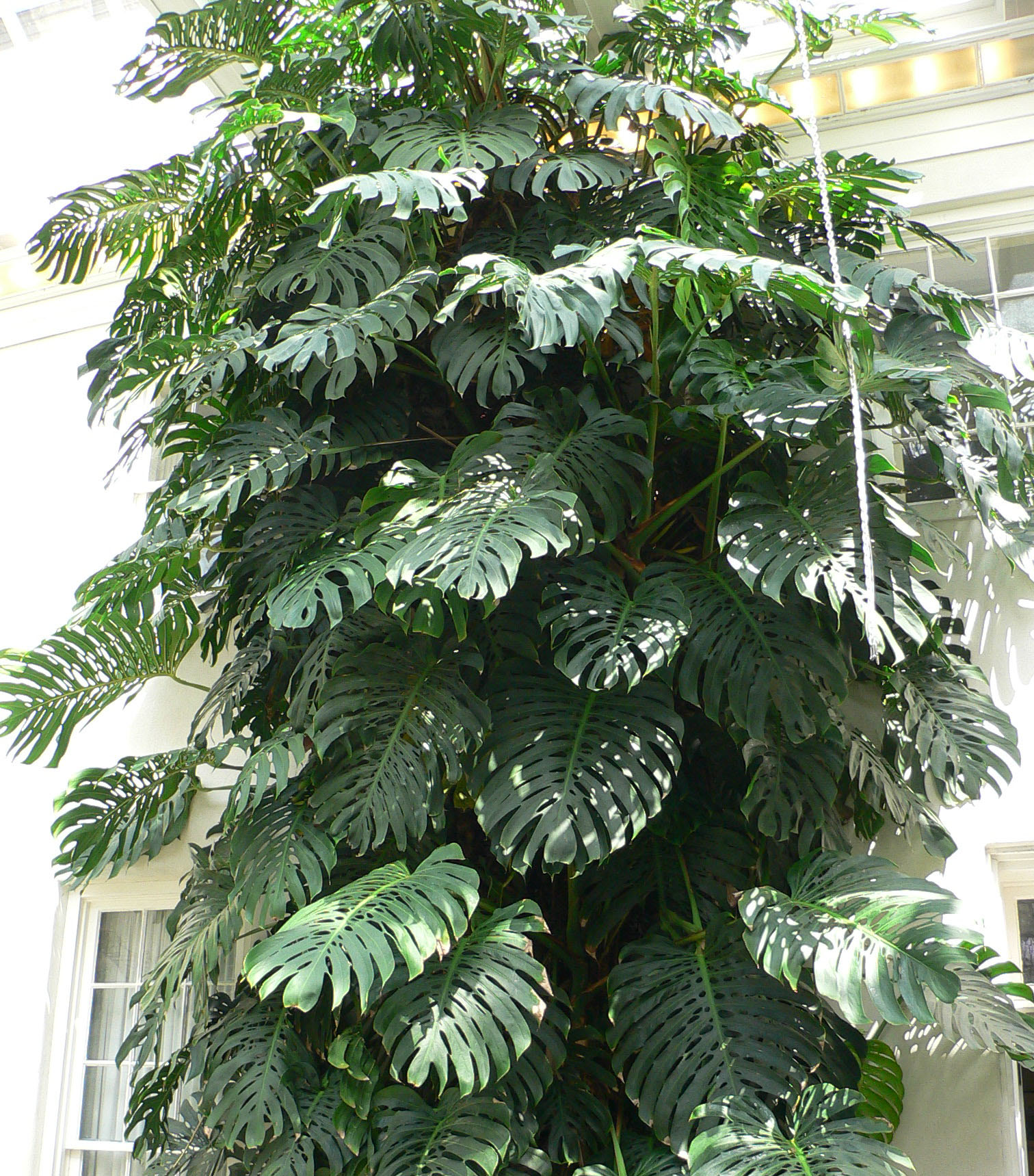
Large Monstera deliciosa

== Species ==
As of November 2022 Plants of the World Online recognizes 70 accepted taxa (of 64 species and 6 infraspecific names):

- Monstera acacoyaguensis Matuda
- Monstera acuminata K.Koch – Shingle plant
- Monstera adansonii Schott
  - Monstera adansonii subsp. adansonii (Schott) Mayo & I.M.Andrade
  - Monstera adansonii subsp. blanchetii (Schott) Mayo & I.M.Andrade
  - Monstera adansonii subsp. klotzschiana (Schott) Mayo & I.M.Andrade
  - Monstera adansonii subsp. laniata (Schott) Mayo & I.M.Andrade
- Monstera alcirana Croat, M.Cedeño, Zuluaga & O.Ortiz
- Monstera alfaroi Croat & M.Cedeño
- Monstera amargalensis Croat & M.M.Mora
- Monstera anomala Zuluaga & Croat
- Monstera aureopinnata Croat
- Monstera barrieri Croat, Moonen & Poncy
- Monstera bocatorensis Croat & M.Cedeño
- Monstera boliviana Rusby
- Monstera buseyi Croat & Grayum
- Monstera cenepensis Croat
- Monstera costaricensis (Engl. & K.Krause) Croat & Grayum
- Monstera croatii M.Cedeño & A.Hay
- Monstera deliciosa Liebm. – Ceriman, Swiss-cheese plant
- Monstera dissecta (Schott) Croat & Grayum
- Monstera donosoensis Croat, M.Cedeño & O.Ortiz
- Monstera dubia (Kunth) Engl. & K.Krause
- Monstera egregia Schott
- Monstera epipremnoides Engl.
- Monstera filamentosa Croat & Grayum
- Monstera florescanoana Croat, T.Krömer & Acebey
- Monstera gambensis M.Cedeño & M.A.Blanco
- Monstera gentryi Croat, M.Cedeño & O.Ortiz
- Monstera gigas Croat, Zuluaga, M.Cedeño & O.Ortiz
- Monstera glaucescens Croat & Grayum
- Monstera gracilis Engl.
- Monstera guzmanjacobiae Diaz Jim., M.Cedeño, Zuluaga & Aguilar-Rodr.
- Monstera integrifolia Zuluaga & Croat
- Monstera juliusii M.Cedeño & Croat
- Monstera kessleri Croat
- Monstera kikiae Zuluaga & M.Cedeño
- Monstera lechleriana Schott
- Monstera lentii Croat & Grayum
- Monstera limitaris M.Cedeño
- Monstera luteynii Madison
- Monstera maderaverde Grayum & Karney
- Monstera membranacea Madison
- Monstera minima Madison
- Monstera mittermeieri M.Cedeño
- Monstera molinae Croat & Grayum
- Monstera momoi M.Cedeño
- Monstera monteverdensis M.Cedeño & Croat
- Monstera obliqua Miq.
- Monstera oreophila Madison
- Monstera pinnatipartita Schott
- Monstera pittieri Engl.
- Monstera planadensis Croat
- Monstera praetermissa E.G.Gonç. & Temponi
- Monstera punctulata (Schott) Schott ex Engl.
- Monstera siltepecana Matuda
- Monstera spruceana (Schott) Engl.
- Monstera standleyana G.S.Bunting
- Monstera subpinnata (Schott) Engl.
- Monstera tablasensis M.Cedeño
- Monstera tacanaensis Matuda
- Monstera tarrazuensis Croat & M.Cedeño
- Monstera tenuis K.Koch
- Monstera titanum Croat, M. Cedeño & O.Ortiz
- Monstera tuberculata Lundell
  - Monstera tuberculata var. brevinoda (Standl. & L.O.Williams) Madison
  - Monstera tuberculata var. tuberculata
- Monstera vasquezii Croat
- Monstera wilsoniensis M.Cedeño & Grayum
- Monstera xanthospatha Madison

Previously included:

- Monstera alticola Croat
- Monstera bocatorana Croat & Grayum
- Monstera coloradensis Croat
- Monstera fortunense Croat
- Monstera gigantea (Roxb.) Schott - Epipremnum giganteum (Roxb.) Schott
- Monstera jefense Croat
- Monstera pirrense Croat

Commonly misidentified as Monstera:

- Philodendron opacum as Monstera sp. 'Peru'
- Rhaphidophora tetrasperma
- Thaumatophyllum bipinnatifidum
