= Monstera oreophila =

Scientific classification
- Kingdom: Plantae
- Clade: Tracheophytes
- Clade: Angiosperms
- Clade: Monocots
- Order: Alismatales
- Family: Araceae
- Genus: Monstera
- Species: M. oreophila

Binomial name
- Monstera oreophila Madison

Species of flowering plant

Monstera oreophila is a flowering plant in the genus Monstera and family Araceae.

== Distribution ==
Monstera Oreophila is native to Costa Rica and Panamá.
