= Monstera minima =

Scientific classification
- Kingdom: Plantae
- Clade: Tracheophytes
- Clade: Angiosperms
- Clade: Monocots
- Order: Alismatales
- Family: Araceae
- Genus: Monstera
- Species: M. minima

Binomial name
- Monstera minima Madison

Species of flowering plant

Monstera minima is a species of flowering plant in the genus Monstera of the arum family, Araceae. Its binomial name minima refers to its tiny foliage, and it is indeed the smallest of the Monstera species when it comes to leaf size. It is most easily distinguished from other species in the genus due to the fact that its peduncles are much longer than its leaves.

== Distribution ==
The species' native range is Panama to North west Colombia. it is only found on the Caribbean coasts of these countries.
