= Monstera tacanaensis =

Scientific classification
- Kingdom: Plantae
- Clade: Tracheophytes
- Clade: Angiosperms
- Clade: Monocots
- Order: Alismatales
- Family: Araceae
- Genus: Monstera
- Species: M. tacanaensis

Binomial name
- Monstera tacanaensis Matuda

Species of plant

Monstera tacanaensis is a species of flowering plant in the genus Monstera of the arum family, Araceae.

== Classification ==
Monstera tacanaensis was treated as a synonym of Monstera deliciosa, however it is a closely related but different species.

== Distribution ==
It is native to Mexico (Chiapas), Guatemala, Costa Rica and Panama.
