= Monstera amargalensis =

Scientific classification
- Kingdom: Plantae
- Clade: Tracheophytes
- Clade: Angiosperms
- Clade: Monocots
- Order: Alismatales
- Family: Araceae
- Genus: Monstera
- Species: M. amargalensis

Binomial name
- Monstera amargalensis Croat & M.M.Mora

Flowering plant

Monstera amargalensis is a flowering plant that belongs to the genus Monstera, and the family Araceae.

== Distribution ==
Its native range is Colombia (Chocó).
