= Monstera buseyi =

Scientific classification
- Kingdom: Plantae
- Clade: Tracheophytes
- Clade: Angiosperms
- Clade: Monocots
- Order: Alismatales
- Family: Araceae
- Genus: Monstera
- Species: M. buseyi

Binomial name
- Monstera buseyi Croat & Grayum

Species of plant

Monstera buseyi is a flowering plant in the family Araceae.

== Distribution ==
It is native to Costa Rica and Panama.
