= Monstera standleyana =

Scientific classification
- Kingdom: Plantae
- Clade: Tracheophytes
- Clade: Angiosperms
- Clade: Monocots
- Order: Alismatales
- Family: Araceae
- Genus: Monstera
- Species: M. standleyana

Binomial name
- Monstera standleyana G.S. Bunting

Species of flowering plant

Monstera standleyana, the five holes plant is a species of flowering plant from family Araceae which can be found in Costa Rica, Honduras, Nicaragua, and Panama. It was described by G.S. Bunting in 1967.
