= Monstera subpinnata =

Scientific classification
- Kingdom: Plantae
- Clade: Tracheophytes
- Clade: Angiosperms
- Clade: Monocots
- Order: Alismatales
- Family: Araceae
- Genus: Monstera
- Species: M. subpinnata

Binomial name
- Monstera subpinnata Engl.

Synonyms
- Tornelia subpinnata Schott; Monstera latiloba K. Krause; Monstera uleana Engl.

Species of flowering plant

Monstera subpinnata is a species of flowering plant native to Bolivia, Peru, Ecuador and Colombia. It grows as an epiphyte. The plant is best known for its pinnate leaves, which are unusual within the genus Monstera. The species can grow as tall as 12 m (39 ft), with leaves growing as large as 40 cm (16 in) long and 30 cm (12 in) wide.
