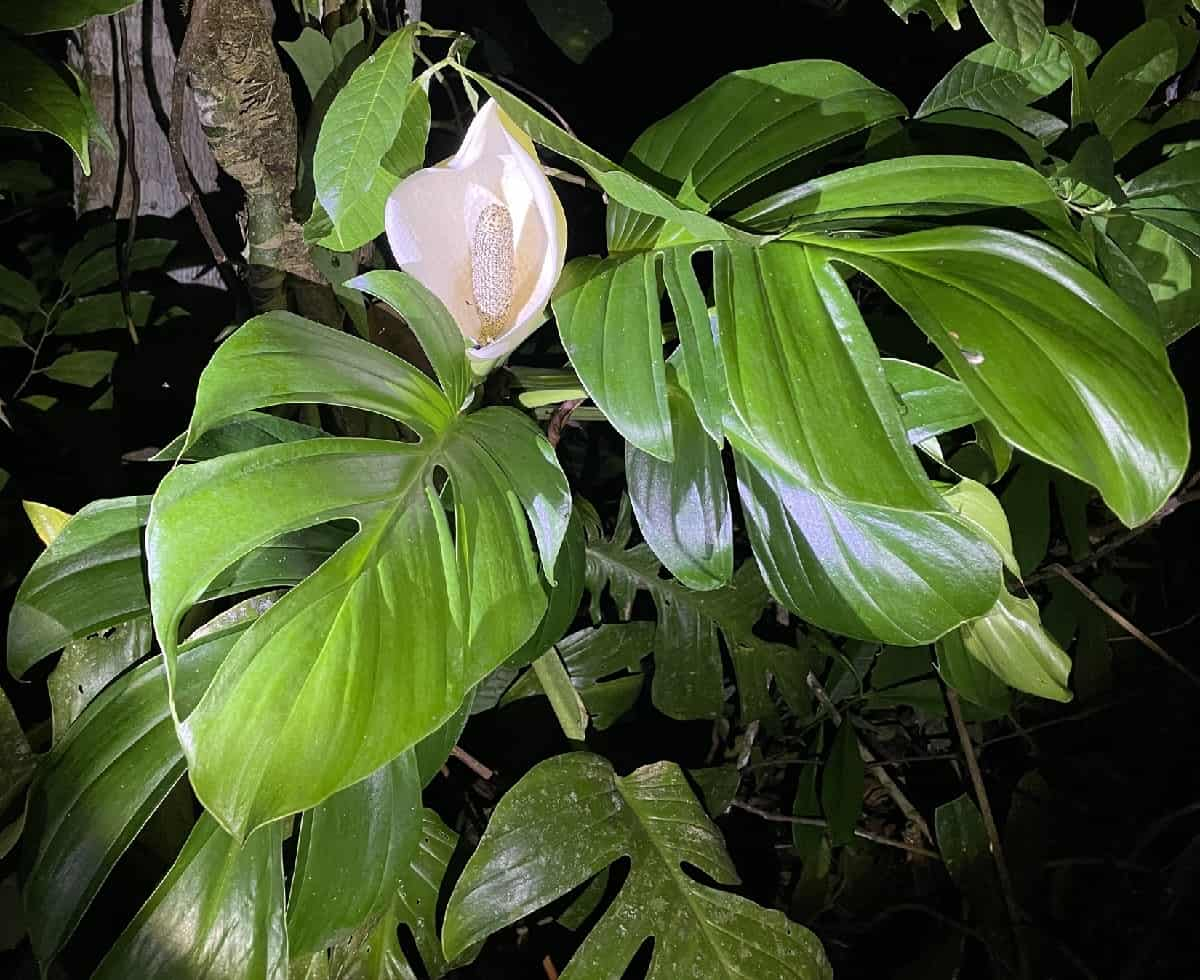
- Flower and leaves

Scientific classification
- Kingdom: Plantae
- Clade: Tracheophytes
- Clade: Angiosperms
- Clade: Monocots
- Order: Alismatales
- Family: Araceae
- Genus: Monstera
- Species: M. dissecta

Binomial name
- Monstera dissecta (Schott) Croat & Grayum

= Monstera dissecta =

Species of flowering plant

Monstera dissecta is a species of flowering plant in the genus Monstera and family Araceae.

== Description ==
The petioles have sheaths with persistent sheath wings that do not dry and fall off.

Monstera dissecta are up to 10 meters (33 feet) in length outdoors, but when cultivated as a houseplant, it typically reaches between 1.2 and 2.4 meters (3.9 and 7.9 ft). Like other members of the genus, it requires support to climb and develop properly.

The plant produces small, white inflorescences. The flower stalk is typically about 1 cm (0.39 in) beyond the spadix.

== Distribution ==
It is native to Brazil Acre, Tocantins, Amazônia, Goiás, and Cerrado.

It has also been found native in Colombia, Panama, Costa Rica, Nicaragua, Honduras, Guatemala, and Belize.
