= Monstera molinae =

Scientific classification
- Kingdom: Plantae
- Clade: Tracheophytes
- Clade: Angiosperms
- Clade: Monocots
- Order: Alismatales
- Family: Araceae
- Genus: Monstera
- Species: M. molinae

Binomial name
- Monstera molinae Croat & Grayum

Species of flowering plant

Monstera molinae is a species of flowering plant in the genus Monstera in the arum family, Araceae.

== Distribution ==
Its native range is Costa Rica to Central Panama.
