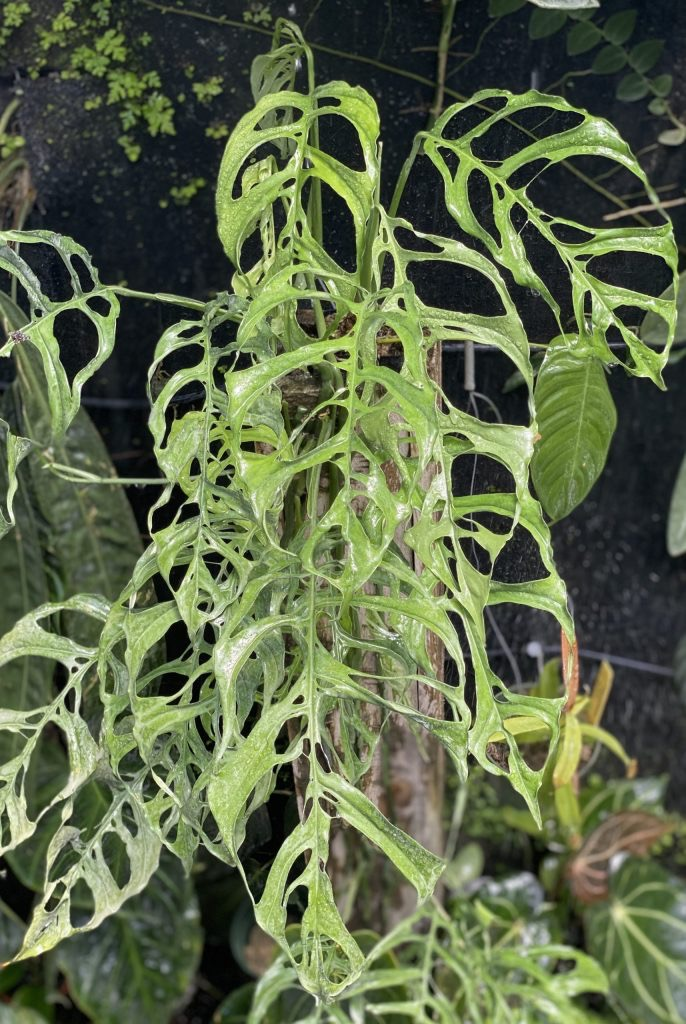
- Monstera obliqua in cultivation

Scientific classification
- Kingdom: Plantae
- Clade: Tracheophytes
- Clade: Angiosperms
- Clade: Monocots
- Order: Alismatales
- Family: Araceae
- Genus: Monstera
- Species: M. obliqua

Binomial name
- Monstera obliqua Miq., Linnaea 18: 79 (1845)

= Monstera obliqua =

Species of flowering plant

Monstera obliqua is a species of the genus Monstera native to Central and South America. It is hemiepiphytic like most other Monstera species. The plant is particularly known for its foliage, which is, in mature specimens of a few varieties, highly perforated, sometimes described as having more empty space than leaf. An illustration of the general variation in adult leaf shape from different individuals of this species can be found in Michael Madison's A Revision of Monstera. The species is not commonly cultivated, but the name is often misapplied to specimens of the more widespread Monstera adansonii.
