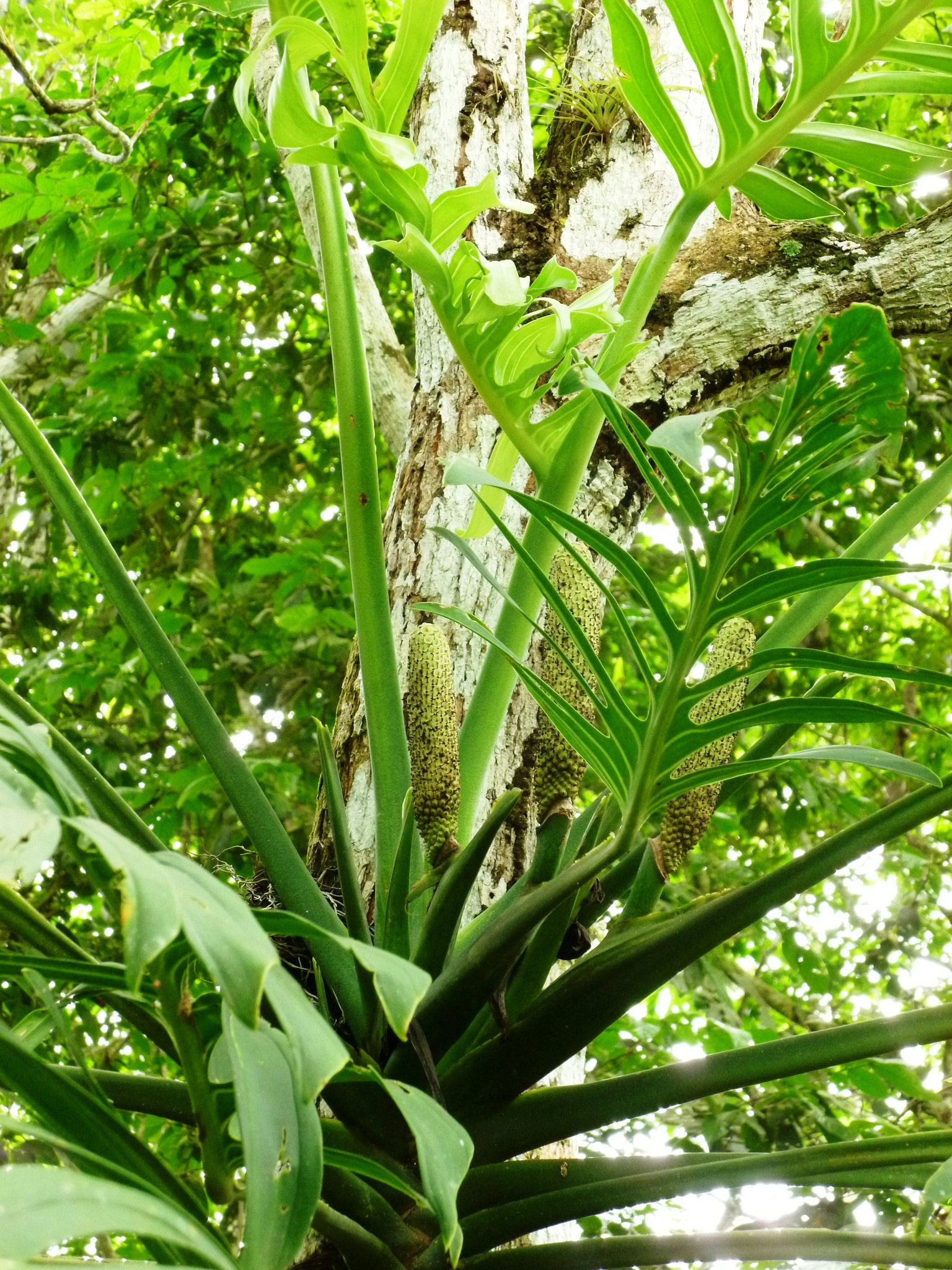
- Monstera pinnatipartita growing in Colombia

Scientific classification
- Kingdom: Plantae
- Clade: Tracheophytes
- Clade: Angiosperms
- Clade: Monocots
- Order: Alismatales
- Family: Araceae
- Genus: Monstera
- Species: M. pinnatipartita

Binomial name
- Monstera pinnatipartita Schott

= Monstera pinnatipartita =

Species of plant

Monstera pinnatipartita is a species of flowering plant in the genus Monstera native to Central America and the tropical areas of South America. Like the more common Monstera deliciosa the plant has green foliage that becomes highly fenestrated when mature, though both immature and mature leaves are less heart shaped. Its name refers to the deeply split mature leaves that are pinnate.
