= Monstera costaricensis =

Scientific classification
- Kingdom: Plantae
- Clade: Tracheophytes
- Clade: Angiosperms
- Clade: Monocots
- Order: Alismatales
- Family: Araceae
- Genus: Monstera
- Species: M. costaricensis

Binomial name
- Monstera costaricensis Engl. & K.Krause

Synonyms
- Rhodospatha costaricensis Engl. & K.Krause

Species of plant

Monstera costarisensis is a flowering plant in the genus Monstera and family Araceae.

== Distribution ==
It is native to Costa Rica.
