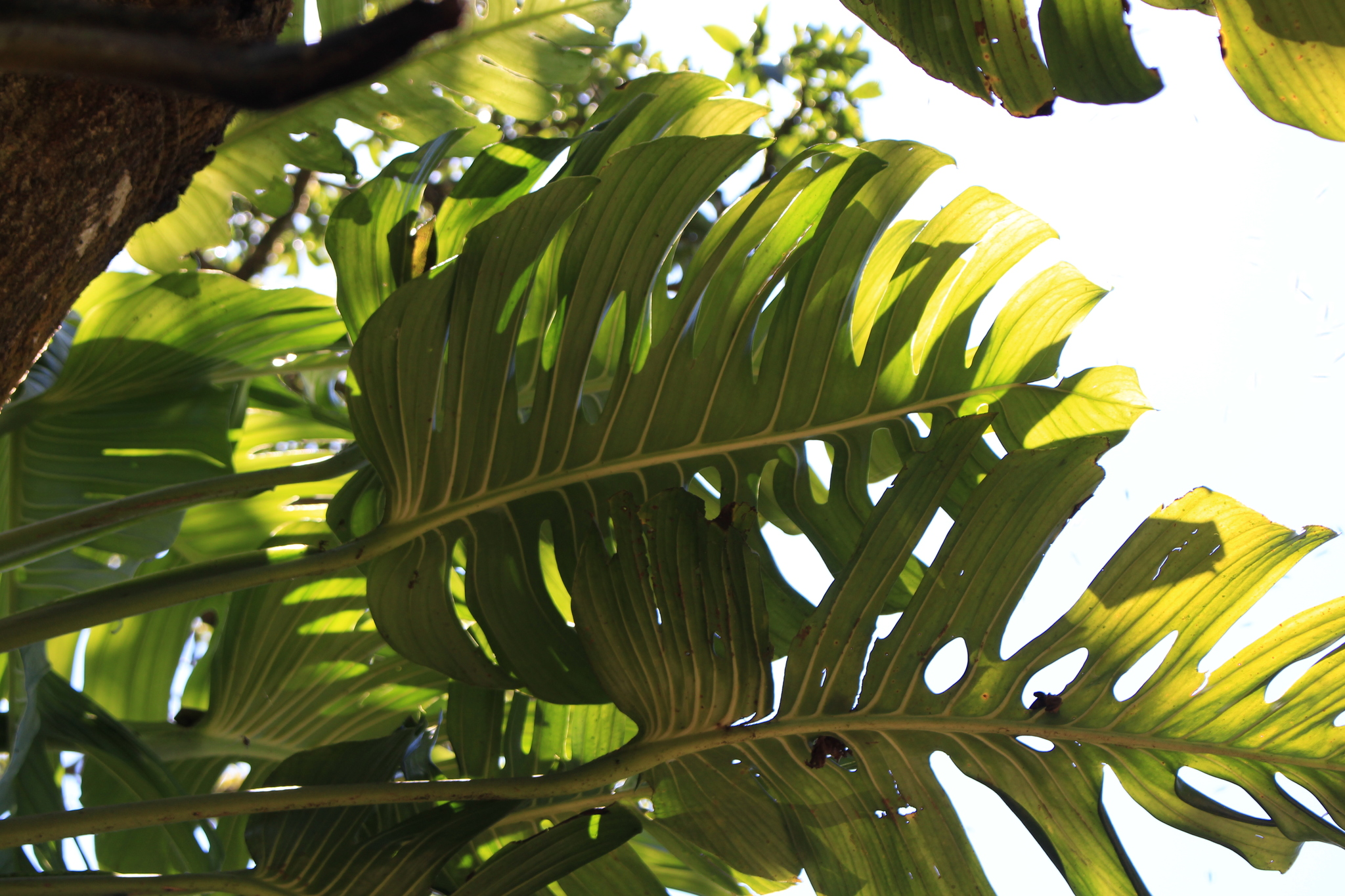

Scientific classification
- Kingdom: Plantae
- Clade: Tracheophytes
- Clade: Angiosperms
- Clade: Monocots
- Order: Alismatales
- Family: Araceae
- Genus: Monstera
- Species: M. lentii

Binomial name
- Monstera lentii Croat & Grayum

= Monstera lentii =

Species of plant

Monstera lentii is a flowering plant in the genus Monstera in the arum family, Araceae.

== Distribution ==
It is native to Costa Rica, and Panama.
