= Gentlea molinae =

Conservation status
- Critically Endangered (IUCN 2.3)

Scientific classification
- Kingdom: Plantae
- Clade: Tracheophytes
- Clade: Angiosperms
- Clade: Eudicots
- Clade: Asterids
- Order: Ericales
- Family: Primulaceae
- Genus: Gentlea
- Species: G. molinae

Binomial name
- Gentlea molinae Lundell

Species of flowering plant

Gentlea molinae is a species of plant in the family Primulaceae. It is endemic to Honduras.
