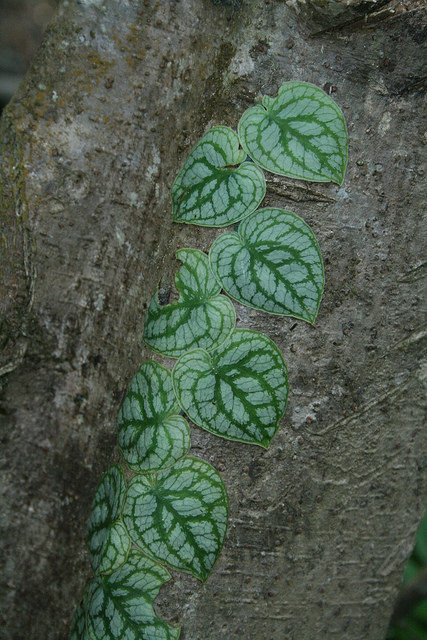
- Juvenile M. dubia leaves

Scientific classification
- Kingdom: Plantae
- Clade: Tracheophytes
- Clade: Angiosperms
- Clade: Monocots
- Order: Alismatales
- Family: Araceae
- Genus: Monstera
- Species: M. dubia

Binomial name
- Monstera dubia (Kunth) Engl. & K.Krause

= Monstera dubia =

Species of flowering plant

Monstera dubia is a species of plant in the genus Monstera native to Central and South America. M. dubia is known for the dramatic transformation of its foliage makes as it climbs from seed stage on the forest floor, to strongly patterned leaves shingling closely up a host tree trunk or other surface, until mature leaves with fenestrations similar to Monstera deliciosa appear. This transformation is an example of leaf dimorphism. Dubia refers to dubious, because authors were not certain that the species fell within the Dicot genus Marcgravia, where it was initially placed.
