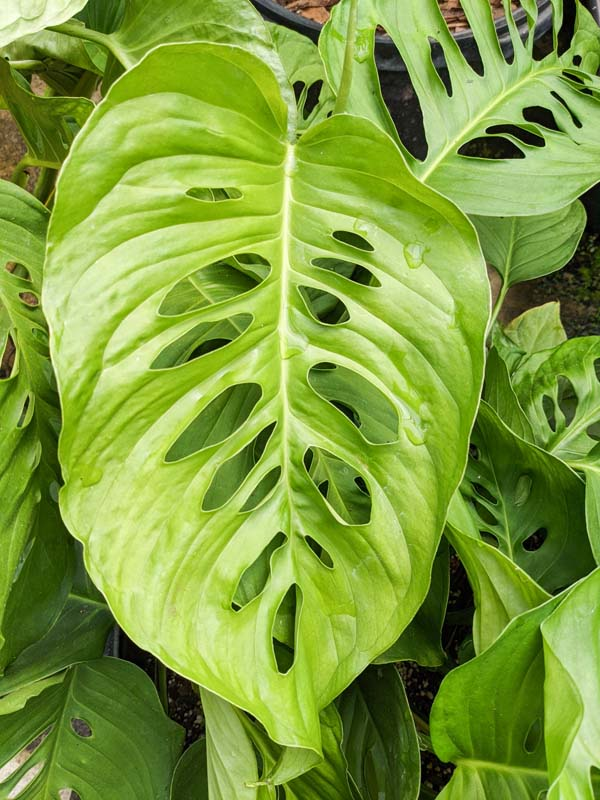

Scientific classification
- Kingdom: Plantae
- Clade: Tracheophytes
- Clade: Angiosperms
- Clade: Monocots
- Order: Alismatales
- Family: Araceae
- Genus: Monstera
- Species: M. lechleriana

Binomial name
- Monstera lechleriana Schott

= Monstera lechleriana =

Species of plant

Monstera lechleriana is a flowering plant in the genus Monstera in the arum family, Araceae. It is native to Bolivia, Colombia, Ecuador, Panamá, Peru, and Venezuela. The species is named for the German botanist Willibald Lechler, who collected the original type specimen in 1854. It was the scientifically described by Heinrich Wilhelm Schott by 1860. Like other species of Monstera, the plant is an epiphytic climbing vine which grows on the lower trunks of trees, and which produces large leaves with perforations when mature that appear on each side of the midrib of the foliage.
