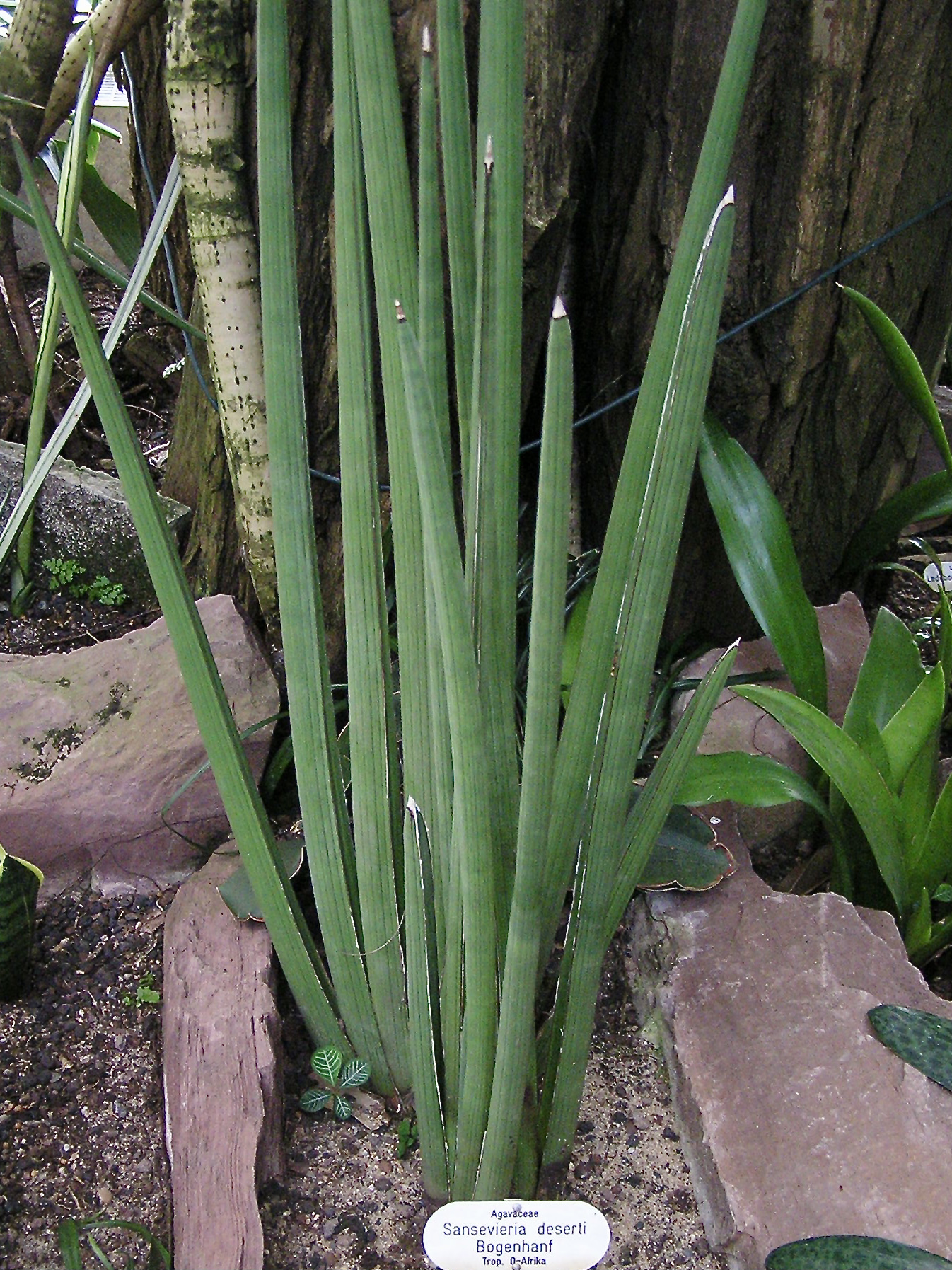
- D. pearsonii growing in the Berggarten

Scientific classification
- Kingdom: Plantae
- Clade: Tracheophytes
- Clade: Angiosperms
- Clade: Monocots
- Order: Asparagales
- Family: Asparagaceae
- Subfamily: Nolinoideae
- Genus: Dracaena
- Species: D. pearsonii

Binomial name
- Dracaena pearsonii (N.E.Br.) Byng & Christenh.

Synonyms
- Sansevieria deserti N.E.Br.; Sansevieria rhodesiana N.E.Br.; Sansevieria pearsonii N.E.Br.

= Dracaena pearsonii =

Species of plant

Dracaena pearsonii is a species of succulent plant native to Southern Africa. This species is in a complex of plants including Dracaena stuckyi and Dracaena angolensis that are characterized by their cylindrical leaves that grow upright in a spear-like habit. It grows in desert or dry shrubland, has thick rhizomes that produce offsets.
