= Greenery =

Greenery may refer to:

- Any foliage of a plant, either live, freshly cut, or artificial. The term is used in the landscaping, interior design, and florist industries.
- A houseplant used for its foliage.
- A slang term for marijuana.
