= Snakeplant =

Snakeplant or snake plant may refer to:

- Dracaena trifasciata, synonym Sansevieria trifasciata, also called mother-in-law's tongue
- Nassauvia serpens
- Turbina corymbosa
- Sansevieria
