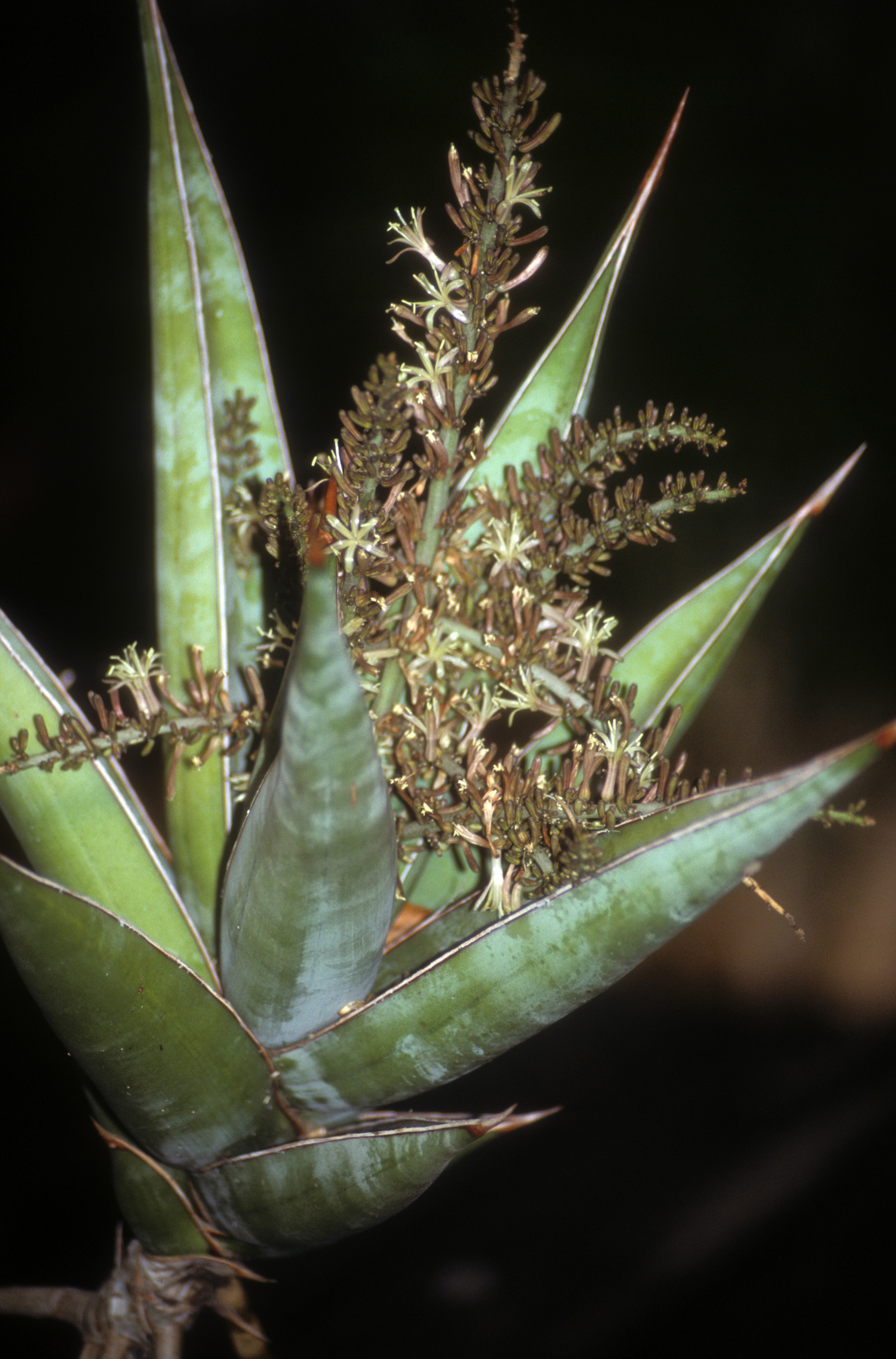
- In flower

Scientific classification
- Kingdom: Plantae
- Clade: Embryophytes
- Clade: Tracheophytes
- Clade: Spermatophytes
- Clade: Angiosperms
- Clade: Monocots
- Order: Asparagales
- Family: Asparagaceae
- Subfamily: Convallarioideae
- Genus: Dracaena
- Species: D. pinguicula

Binomial name
- Dracaena pinguicula (P.R.O.Bally) Byng & Christenh.

Synonyms
- Sansevieria pinguicula P.R.O.Bally

= Dracaena pinguicula =

Walking sansevieria

Species of flowering plant

Dracaena pinguicula, synonym Sansevieria pinguicula, also known as the walking sansevieria, is a xerophytic CAM succulent native to the Bura area of Kenya, near Garissa. The species was described by Peter René Oscar Bally in 1943.

== Etymology ==
The specific epithet is derived from the Latin pinguis, meaning "fat", attributed to the shape of the leaves.

== Characteristics ==
=== Habit ===
Dracaena pinguicula is a short, erect plant resembling a dwarf agave. It is best known for its growing habit: unlike most related species, which grow from an underground rhizome, this species produces aerial stolons which terminate in new plantlets. These then produce stilt-like roots that extend downward to the ground, resulting in a plant that appears to be walking away from its parent.

=== Foliage ===
The blue-green leaves of D. pinguicula are covered in a thick waxy cuticle, and contain the deepest stomata of any former Sansevieria species. The leaves are arranged in a rosette and lunate in cross section. The leaves can be 12–30 cm in length, 2.8–3.5 cm thick, and are tipped with a single sharp spine. A wide channel runs the full length of each leaf and has reddish-brown margins edged with tough, papery white cuticle The underside of each leaf is smooth when water is plentiful but develops deep longitudinal grooves in drier conditions as the plant draws upon the water stored in its leaves, allowing it to survive in one of the most arid regions of Kenya.

=== Roots ===
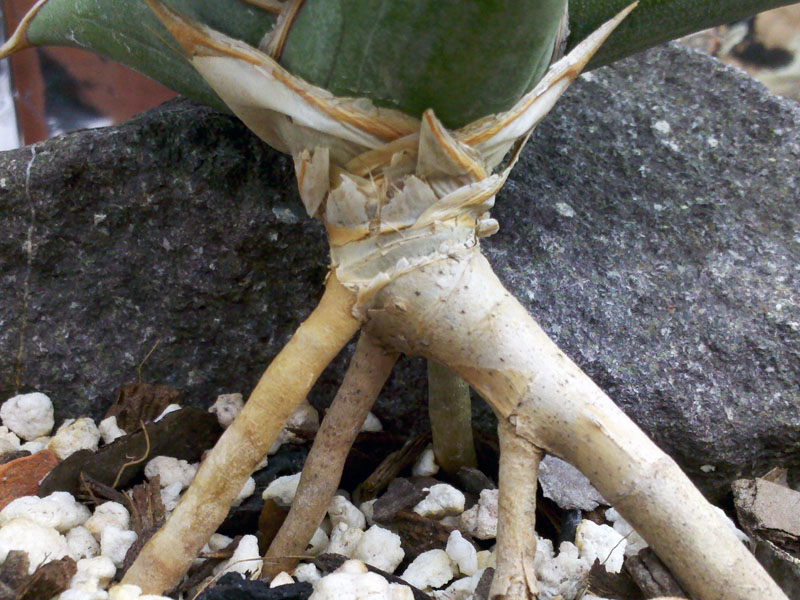
Stilt-like roots holding a young plantlet above the surface. The stolon is visible to the right.

The defining characteristic of D. pinguicula are its thick stilt-like roots. Each rosette produces several of these roots, which can elevate the plant several inches off the ground and are covered in a thick brown cuticle. Fine roots are produced underground and are responsible for nutrient and moisture absorption. During the dry season, the fine roots will die, and the plant will enter dormancy. However, the thick succulent roots survive and the plant will resume growth once the wet season arrives and the roots regrow.

=== Flowers ===
Flowers are borne in clusters of 5–6 on an erect branched panicle 15–32 cm long. The flower bracts are small, brownish and bottle shaped with white anthers and stamens. Fertilized flowers produce globular berries, however very few fruit mature to produce seed. The flower spike develops from the apical meristem and a rosette will no longer grow after blooming. However, the rosette will not die after flowering, and will instead produce many stolons bearing young plantlets.

== Cultivation ==
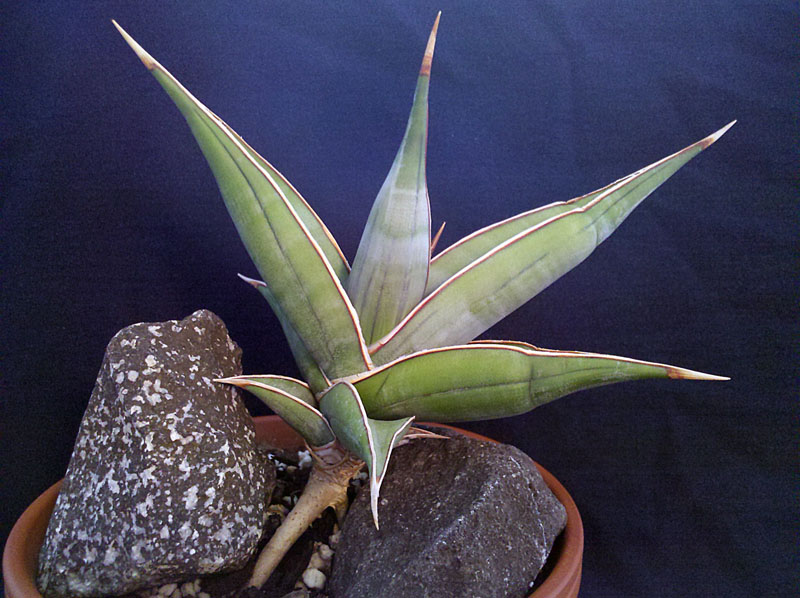
Young plant in cultivation

Dracaena pinguicula is extremely slow growing and requires warm temperatures to grow. It is therefore difficult to find in cultivation. Variegated specimens are highly prized but rarely arise, and are sold at high prices. Normal specimens are more common but still highly sought after due to their unique growing habit.

=== Soil and water ===
In cultivation, D. pinguicula, like most xerophytic plants, grows best in porous, well drained soil. Excessive watering will cause the fleshy roots to rot, so it is essential that the soil is allowed to dry sufficiently between waterings. Many growers prefer a coarse potting mix consisting of a combination of inorganic and organic ingredients. Gravel, perlite, vermiculite, and decomposed granite are commonly used to add weight and improve drainage, while bark chips and coconut coir or husks are used for moisture retention. Such a porous mix will prevent over watering and provide ample aeration, but requires more frequent watering to prevent over drying.

=== Temperature ===
D. pinguicula will die if temperatures drop below 7 °C with wet soil. However, it can survive near freezing temperatures if the soil is dry. The plant grows best in warm daytime temperatures from 25 to 35 °C with cooler night temperatures from 10 to 20 °C.

=== Light ===
D. pinguicula will survive in a wide range of light conditions from direct outdoor sunlight to deep shade indoors. Under low light conditions the leaves may become etiolated, evident through a darker green colouration of the leaves, which become longer and thinner than usual. D. pinguicula grows best in bright light for 12–16 hours a day. In higher latitudes, many botanical gardens with specimen plants induce dormancy by stopping watering during the winter, when days are too short to sustain normal growth. This cycle roughly emulates the wet and dry seasons of the plant in habitat.

== Propagation ==
Most related species seldom set seed, and commercial species such as Dracaena trifasciata are typically grown using micropropagation. However, since D. pinguicula grows so slowly, micropropagation is unprofitable. Therefore, vegetative propagation by division or by leaf cutting is the preferred method.

=== Division ===
This can be done by removing and rooting the plantlets produced at the end of each stolon. Since the plantlets grow a rosette of leaves before beginning root growth, when rooting plantlets, it is very important that plantlet is not removed before it has developed stilt roots to a length of at least 3 cm. If removed too soon, the plantlet will not have the energy or water reserves to produce roots before dying. Once stilt roots have been grown to sufficient length, however, the stolon can be cut at any point and the new plant can be potted in slightly moist porous soil.

Depending on conditions, a plantlet can take anywhere from a few weeks to almost a year before producing new roots, and may take even longer to grow fine roots and become established. Division is the preferred method for propagating most specimens, and in particular, variegated specimens, since leaf cuttings typically do not preserve the variegation.

=== Leaf cutting ===
Leaf cutting is typically used once rosettes have already flowered, in which case they will no longer grow. Whole leaves can be cut from the rosette and set aside for several days to allow the cut to dry. At this point the leaf can be inserted cut-side down into moist porous potting medium to root. Over time, the leaf will produce roots and a stolon from the cut which will bear a new plant at its tip. Since variegation is produced through rare somatic mutations in the apical meristem, this is the preferred method for generating variegated specimens due to the volume of leaves which can be rooted simultaneously.
