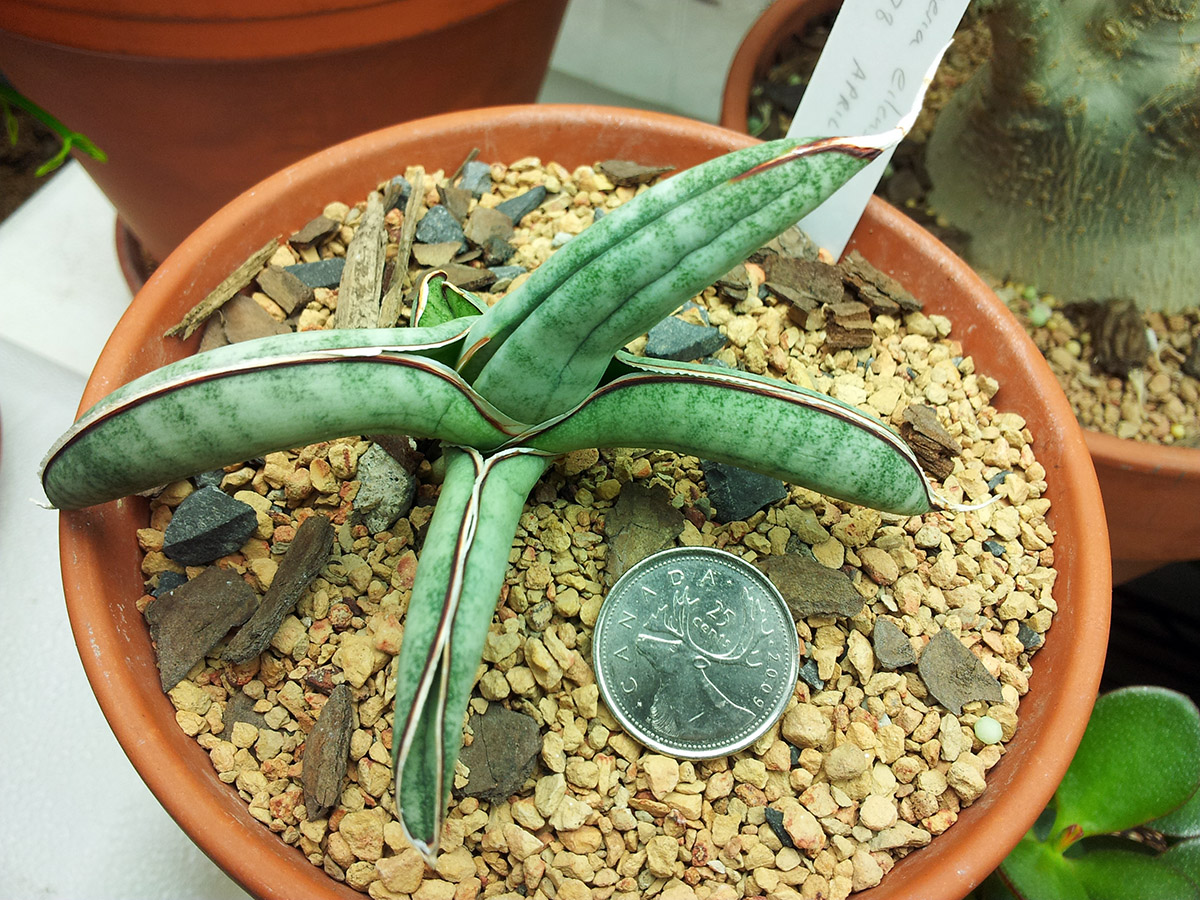

Scientific classification
- Kingdom: Plantae
- Clade: Tracheophytes
- Clade: Angiosperms
- Clade: Monocots
- Order: Asparagales
- Family: Asparagaceae
- Subfamily: Nolinoideae
- Genus: Dracaena
- Species: D. eilensis

Binomial name
- Dracaena eilensis Chahin. Byng & Christenh.

Synonyms
- Sansevieria eilensis Chahin.

= Dracaena eilensis =

Species of flowering plant

Dracaena eilensis, synonym Sansevieria eilensis, is a species of succulent plant native to a small region of Somalia near the town of Eyl. The species was collected in 1973 by John Lavranos.

== Description ==
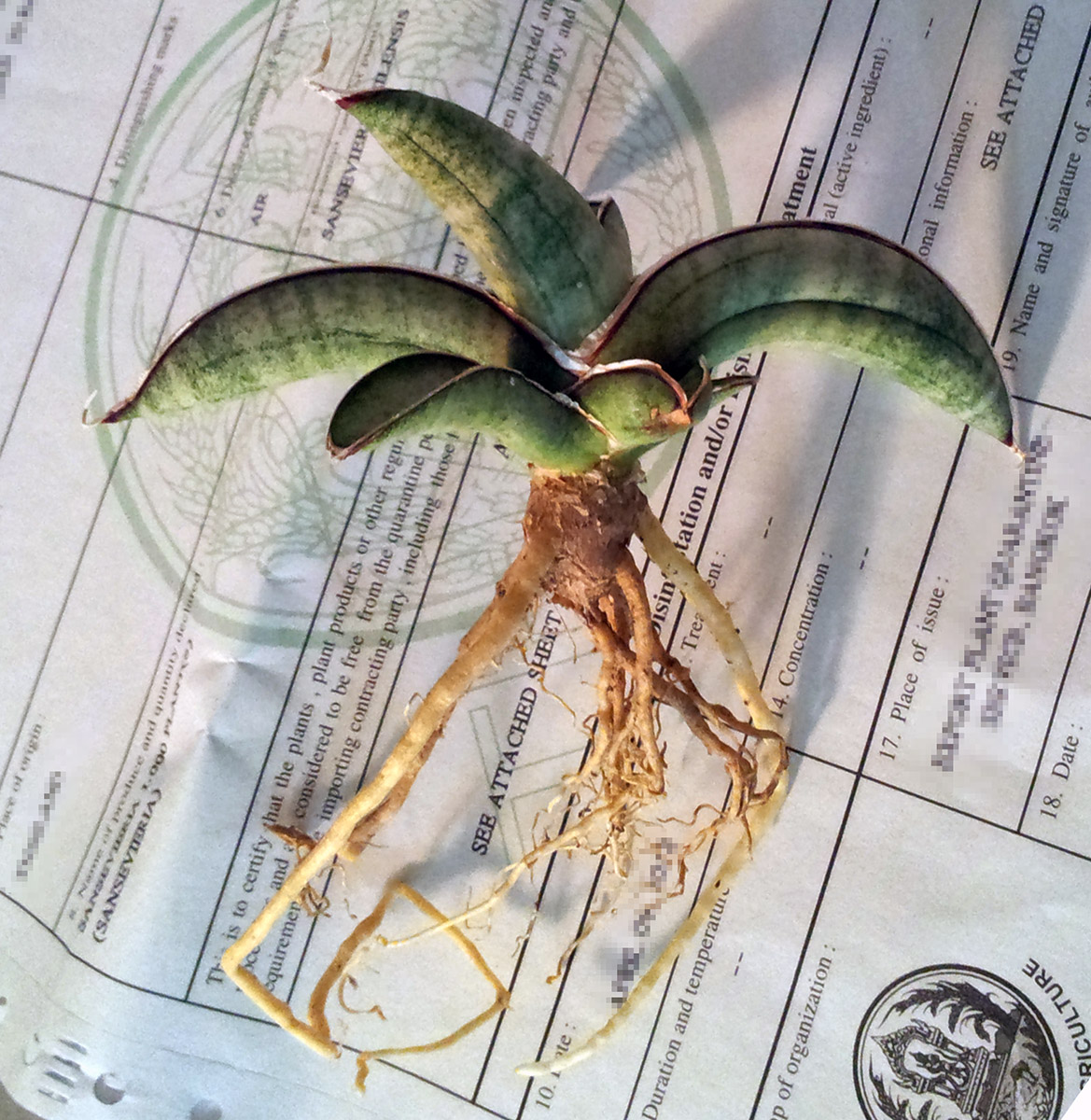
Roots showing thick underground rhizome directly below the leaves, and succulent white roots. The fine roots are dead and dry, but will be regrown once the plant is potted.

Dracaena eilensis is a slow growing plant with rough, cylindrical, downward curving leaves which arise from an underground rhizome. A mature plant typically has 2 to 3 leaves, which are succulent and between 7–12 cm long and 1.9-2.5 cm thick.

The leaves are typically a light bluish-green colour with regular bands of white. The leaves are also marked by several green longitudinal lines, marking areas where the leaf will fold in on itself during drought, or swell after watering.

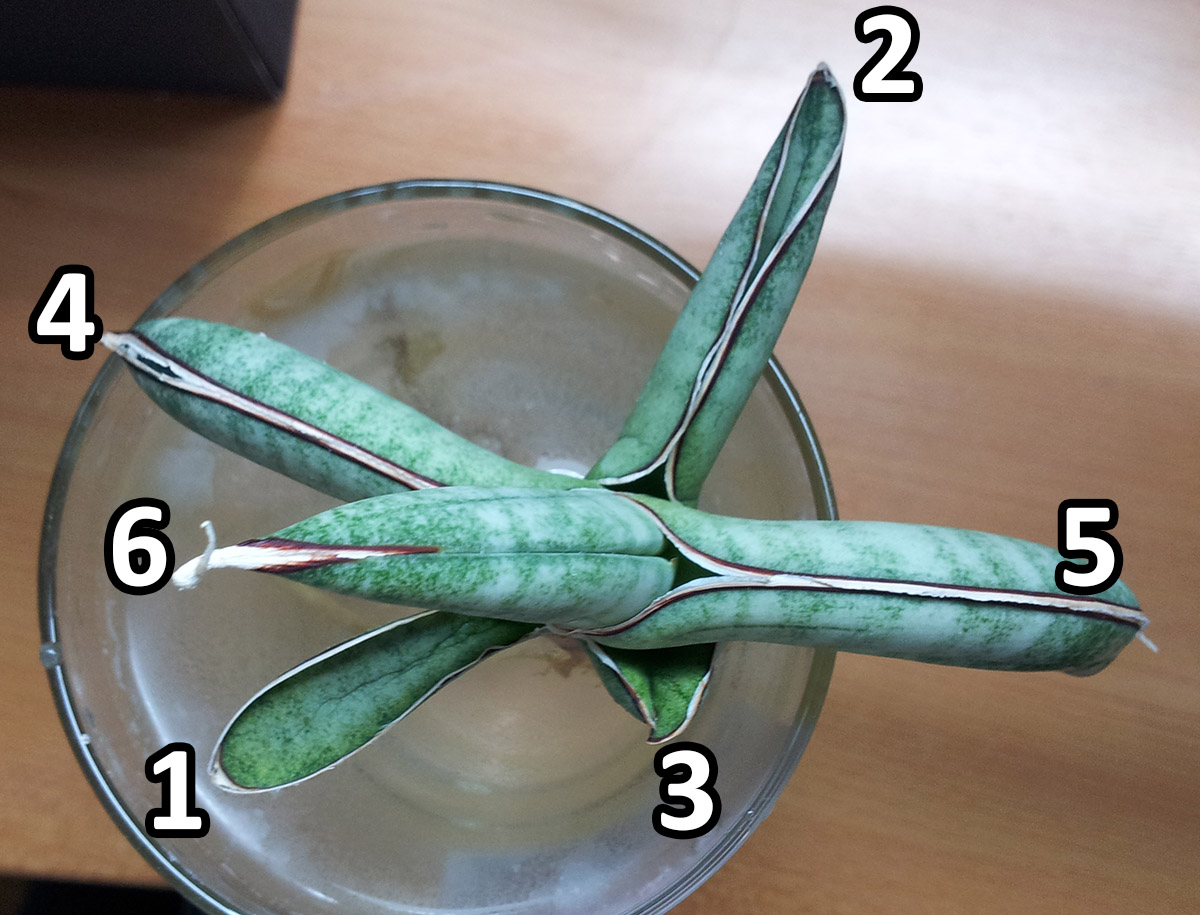
Leaves showing change in leaf morphology as the plant grows. Leaves are numbered 1 to 6 in order from oldest to newest. Leaf 3 has been removed to use for vegetative propagation.

The leaves change morphology dramatically as the plant grows. Young plants have a deep channel, which runs the full length of each leaf, and has reddish-brown margins edged with a papery brown cuticle. As the plant matures, the edges of newer leaves roll together to form a smooth cylindrical leaf with a dried papery cuticle at the tip and base of each leaf.

Dracaena eilensis flowers are borne on a spike-like raceme approximately 30 cm long.

== Distribution and habitat ==
Dracaena eilensis is found only in a small region near Eyl. This region receives less than 100 mm rainfall annually, which is unusually dry even among xerophytic sansevierias. The air temperature in this region ranges between 22-35 °C while the soil temperature is typically 24-27 °C.

== Cultivation ==
Dracaena eilensis is rarely found in cultivation. The plant is extremely slow growing, and requires warm temperatures and bright light to grow, making commercial cultivation unviable. Limited cultivation of D. eilensis using micropropagation has been successfully employed by collectors and enthusiasts, but as of writing, D. eilensis is not available from any commercial sources.

D. eilensis, like most xerophytic Dracaena, grows best in porous, well drained soil. Excessive watering will cause the fleshy roots to rot, so it is essential that the soil is allowed to dry sufficiently between waterings. Many growers prefer a coarse potting mix consisting of a combination of inorganic and organic ingredients. Gravel, perlite, vermiculite, and decomposed granite are commonly used to add weight and improve drainage, while bark chips and coconut coir or husks are used for moisture retention. Such a porous mix will prevent over watering and provide ample aeration, but requires more frequent watering to prevent over drying.
