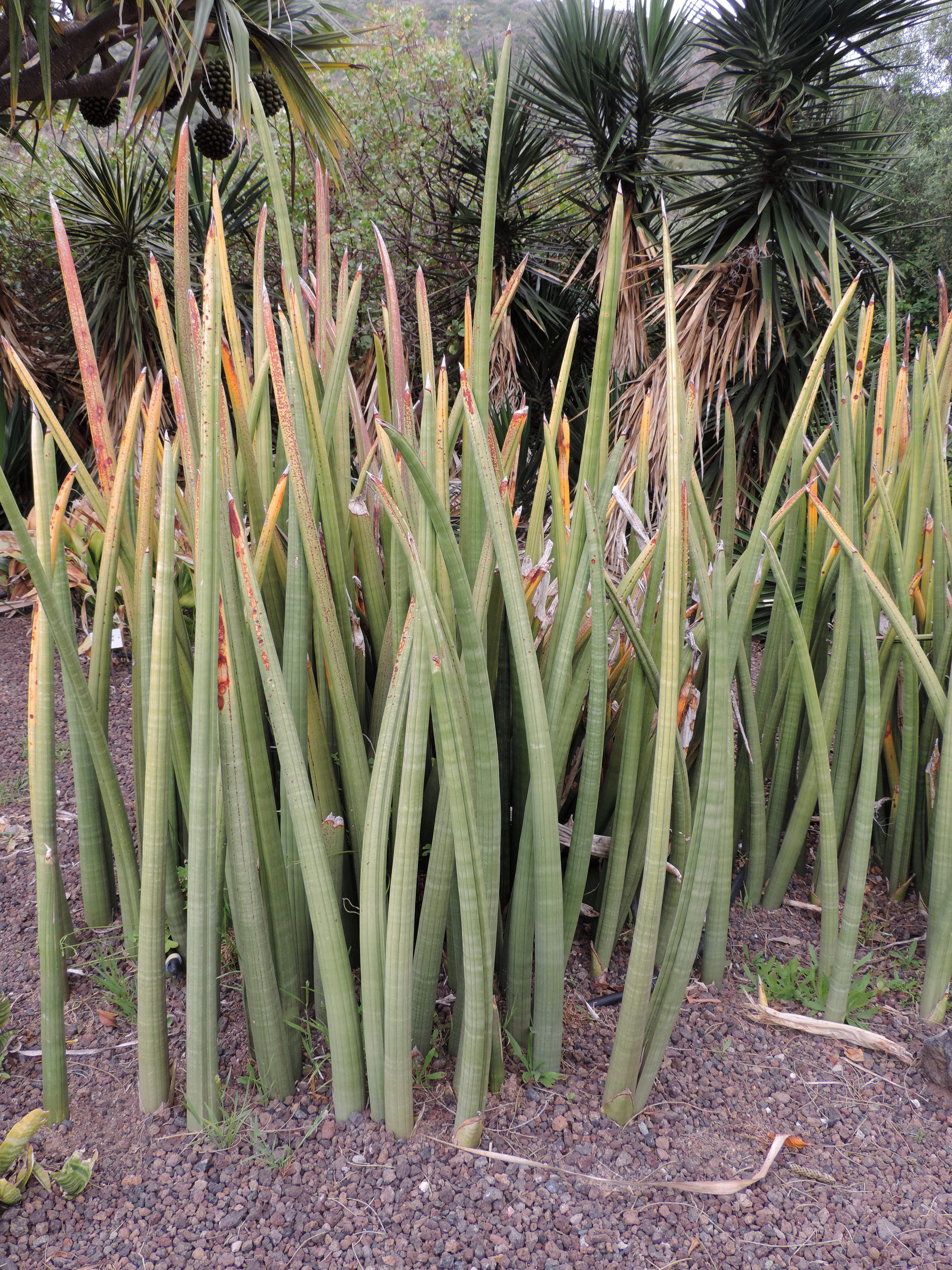

Scientific classification
- Kingdom: Plantae
- Clade: Tracheophytes
- Clade: Angiosperms
- Clade: Monocots
- Order: Asparagales
- Family: Asparagaceae
- Subfamily: Nolinoideae
- Genus: Dracaena
- Species: D. stuckyi

Binomial name
- Dracaena stuckyi (God.-Leb.) Byng & Christenh.

Synonyms
- Acyntha stuckyi (God.-Leb.) Chiov.; Sansevieria andradae God.-Leb.; Sansevieria stuckyi God.-Leb.

= Dracaena stuckyi =

Species of flowering plant

Dracaena stuckyi, synonym Sansevieria stuckyi, is a species of succulent plant native to Africa including Mozambique, Tanzania, and southern Kenya. It is a member of a group of related Dracaena including Dracaena angolensis and Dracaena pearsonii, that grow upright, cylindrical foliage and are native to dry biomes.

== Description ==
Dracaena stuckyi can form clustering series of short distichous stems each bearing from one to several erect leaves, along the trailing rhizomes of the plant. Leaves are circular in cross-section but with a shallow channel on the inner side, leathery, fleshy, dark and decorated with pale marbling. Plants grow to a height of approximately 2 metres depending on light and moisture availability.

Inflorescences occur in spring or autumn, bearing fragrant, yellow-white flowers.
