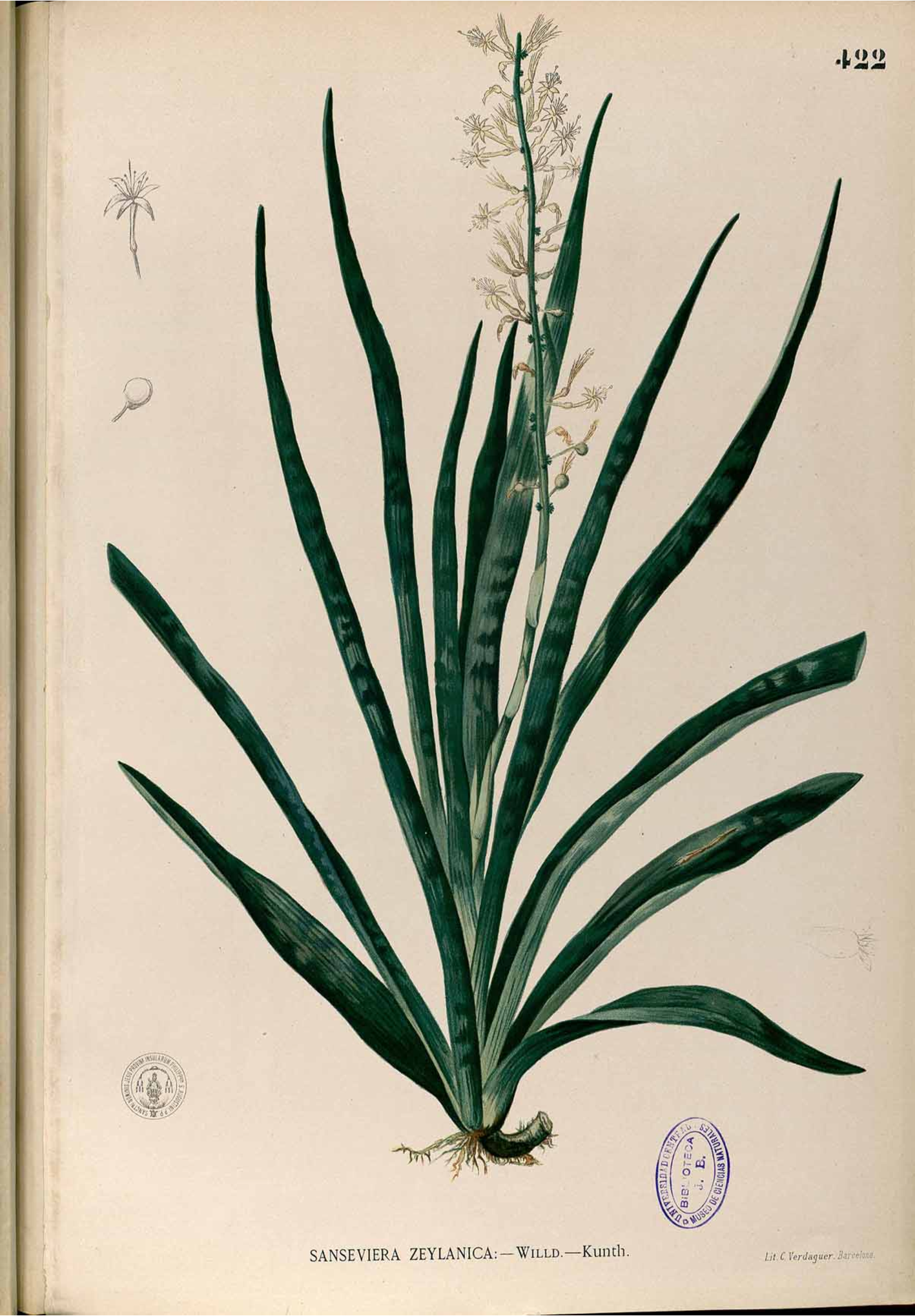
- Botanical illustration as Sansevieria zeylanica

Scientific classification
- Kingdom: Plantae
- Clade: Tracheophytes
- Clade: Angiosperms
- Clade: Monocots
- Order: Asparagales
- Family: Asparagaceae
- Subfamily: Convallarioideae
- Genus: Dracaena
- Species: D. zeylanica

Binomial name
- Dracaena zeylanica (L.) Mabb.

Synonyms
- Acyntha zeylanica (L.) Kuntze; Cordyline zeylanica (L.) Britton; Sansevieria zeylanica (L.) Willd.; Aloe hyacinthoides var. zeylanica L.; Aloe zeylanica (L.) Jacq.; Sansevieria ensifolia Haw.; Sansevieria grandicuspis Haw.; Sansevieria indica Herter; Sansevieria pumila Haw.

= Dracaena zeylanica =

Species of flowering plant

Dracaena zeylanica is a species of flowering plant in the family Asparagaceae, native to southern India and Sri Lanka. It is better known under the synonym Sansevieria zeylanica.

== Misidentifications ==
Early in the 20th century, Dracaena trifasciata was incorrectly called Sansevieria zeylanica in the literature. Non-variegated forms of Dracaena trifasciata are still often traded as Sansevieria zeylanica, but the true Dracaena zeylanica is poorly known and uncommon in cultivation.

Dracaena zeylanica is a leafier plant (10-16 leaves per rosette, versus generally 2–4 in Dracaena trifasciata), and its leaves lack a petiole, instead becoming only slightly narrower at the base. In D. trifasciata, leaves become narrower and thickened towards the bottom, forming a concave channel at the base of the leaves.
