= Houseplant =

Ornamental plant in a home or office

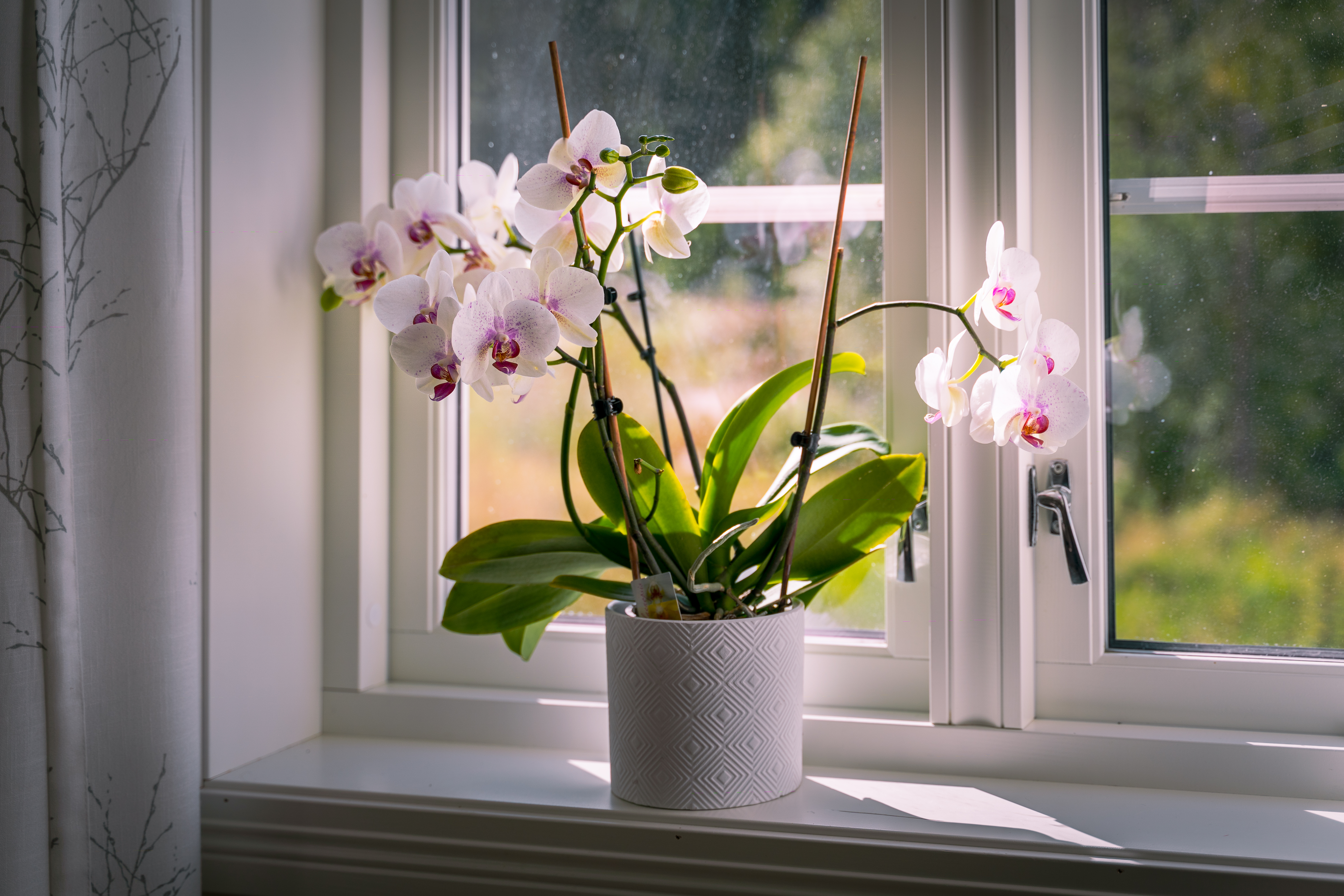
An orchid kept as a houseplant on an indoor windowsill

A houseplant, also known as a pot plant, potted plant, or indoor plant, is an ornamental plant cultivated indoors for aesthetic or practical purposes. These plants are commonly found in homes, offices, and various indoor spaces, where they contribute to the ambiance by adding natural beauty and improving air quality. Most houseplants are tropical or semi-tropical species, as they thrive in the warm, humid conditions often found indoors. Many of them are epiphytes (plants that grow on other plants), succulents (which store water in their leaves), or cacti, which are particularly well-suited to indoor environments due to their low maintenance requirements.

== Care ==
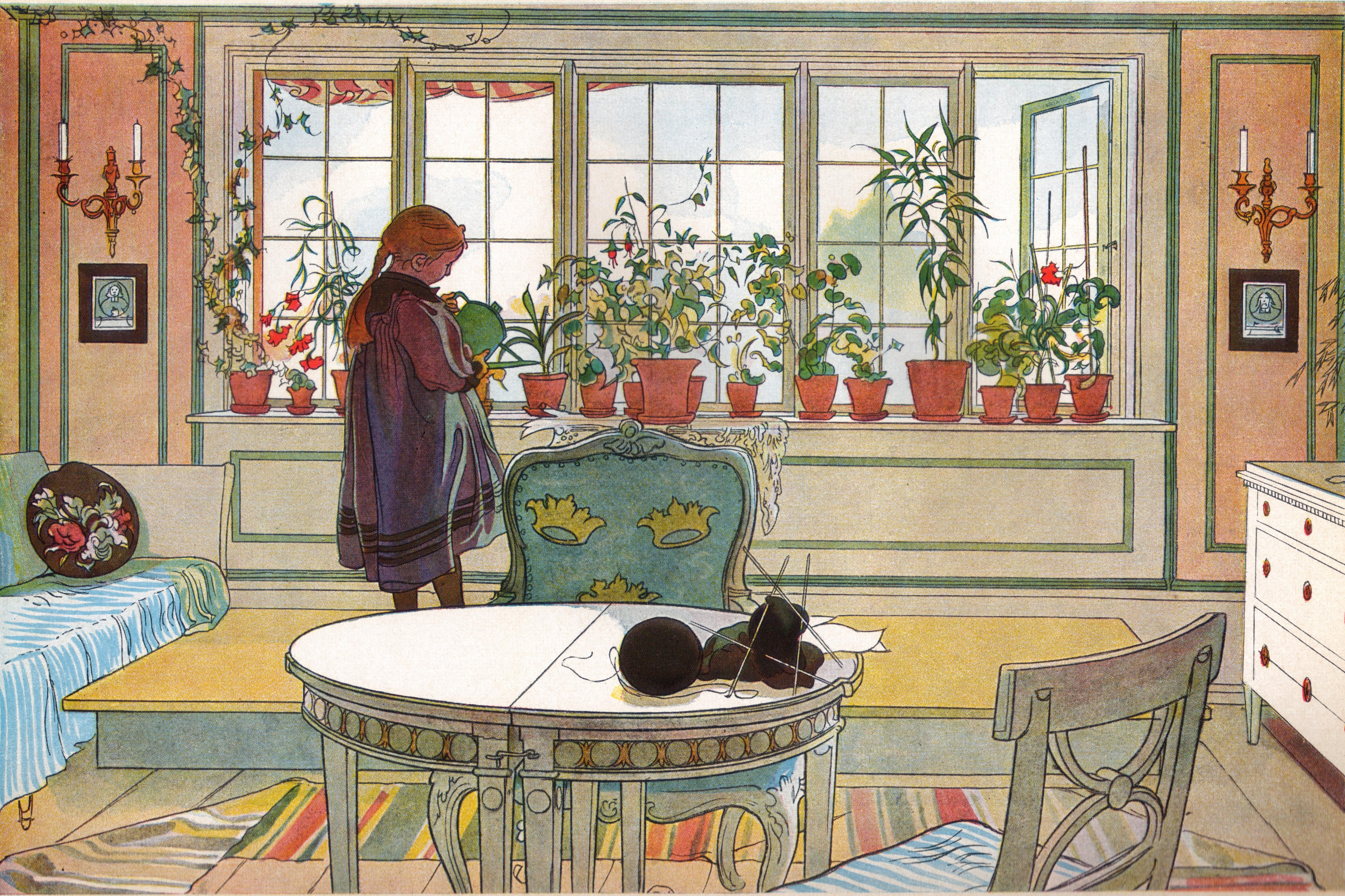
"Flowers on the Windowsill", 1894

Houseplants have care requirements that differ from plants grown outdoors. Moisture, light, soil mixture, temperature, ventilation, humidity, fertilizers, and potting are all important factors. Each plant species has different care requirements, and care requirements can vary based on the specific pot, location in a particular home and potting mix used. However, all potted plants should have drainage holes to prevent root rot. One way to ensure drainage without a saucer below the pot to catch drippings is by using a "cache pot", which is essentially a larger pot intended to catch excess water, with an interior pot, often made of plastic, as the inner sleeve holding the soil.

Most houseplants are species that have adapted to survive in a temperature range between 15 and 25 °C (59 and 77 °F) year-round, as those adapted for temperate environments require winter temperatures outside of normal indoor conditions. Within that limitation, there are houseplants which are native to many different types of habitats, from tropical rainforests to succulents and cacti native to deserts. Many houseplants are either epiphytes or live in seasonally dry ecosystems that help them adapt to the dry indoor air and inconsistent watering many houseplants are subject to. Often, houseplants from tropical areas are understory plants, and because they grow in shady conditions naturally, they are often able to thrive in lower-light conditions.

Selected houseplants are typically of healthy origin, with tidy leaves and upright stems. Houseplants which survive in conditions similar to a homeowner's living space will have a higher probability of survival. Tropical houseplants which grow under high thresholds of heat, for instance, will grow sun leaves which contain fewer chloroplasts. Plants which grow in the shade will grow shade leaves, containing more chloroplasts. Horticulturists at Texas A&M University recommend acclimatization, a gradual process in which plants with too much or too little light or heat exposure are balanced accordingly to prevent overexposure. The brightness and strength of the light source under which a plant lives, including how long it spends under that light source, is vital to its survival. Other factors, like humidity and ventilation, must be kept under regular levels to prevent plant failure and susceptibility to disease.

Houseplants are typically grown in specialized soilless mixtures called potting compost (in the UK), potting mix, or potting soil. Most potting mixes contain a combination of peat or coir and vermiculite or perlite.

Keeping plants consistently too wet ("overwatering") leads to the roots sitting in water, which often leads to root rot. Root rot is the most common cause of death for houseplants but keeping houseplants too dry ("under-watering") can also be detrimental.

Plants require nitrate, phosphate, and potassium to survive, as well as micronutrients including boron, zinc, manganese, iron, copper, molybdenum, and chlorine. Houseplants do not have access to these nutrients unless they are fertilized regularly.

House plants are generally planted in pots that have drainage holes, to reduce the likelihood of over-watering and standing water. Pots are typically broken down into two groups: porous and non-porous. Porous pots (usually terracotta) provide better aeration as air passes laterally through the sides of the pot. Non-porous pots such as glazed or plastic pots tend to hold moisture longer and restrict airflow.

Houseplants experience a range of pests. Fungus gnats, spider mites, mealybugs, thrips and scale are common pests.

With the right care, succulents avoid pests and diseases and achieve optimal growth. By picking the right succulent and taking care of its soil and watering needs, the houseplant lives long to serve its purpose.

=== Indoor environment ===
Houseplants positively influence the indoor environment by improving the microbiome, increasing beneficial bacteria, and reducing harmful fungi, which can enhance air quality and health. They also boost humidity levels through transpiration, helping to prevent dryness in the air and discomfort to the skin and respiratory system. Plants regulate temperature by providing natural cooling and reduce noise by absorbing sound, creating a more comfortable and peaceful indoor atmosphere. These benefits make houseplants valuable for both physical well being and overall indoor comfort.

=== Alternative growing methods ===
Houseplants are also grown in a variety of media other than potting mix, often in a hydroponic or semi-hydroponic system. This may overlap with aquascaping. Materials like sand, gravel, brick, expanded clay aggregate and styrofoam may be employed.

Some epiphytic plants may be grown mounted, either with their roots in potting mix and their stems attached to supports, or with their roots wrapped in sphagnum moss and attached to a vertical surface with wire. This can also overlap with the practice of kokedama.

== Cultural history ==
=== Early history ===
The history of houseplants is intertwined with the history of container gardening in general. Ancient Egyptians grew ornamental (flowers) and fruiting plants in decorative containers, where blue and white lotus floral arrangements gave rise to more luxuriant bouquets during the New Kingdom. Egyptian Queen Hatshepsut grew frankincense in her temple in 1478 BC. Ancient Greeks and the Romans cultivated laurel trees (Laurus nobilis) in earthenware vessels. Roman villas were perfumed with the blossom of citrus trees. In ancient China, potted plants were shown at garden exhibitions over 2,500 years ago, and they were seen as a symbol of wealth. In around 600 BC, King Nebuchadnezzar constructed a botanical garden for his wife, Queen Amytis, filling it with fragrant flowers.

In the medieval era, gillyflowers were displayed in containers.

=== Early modern era ===
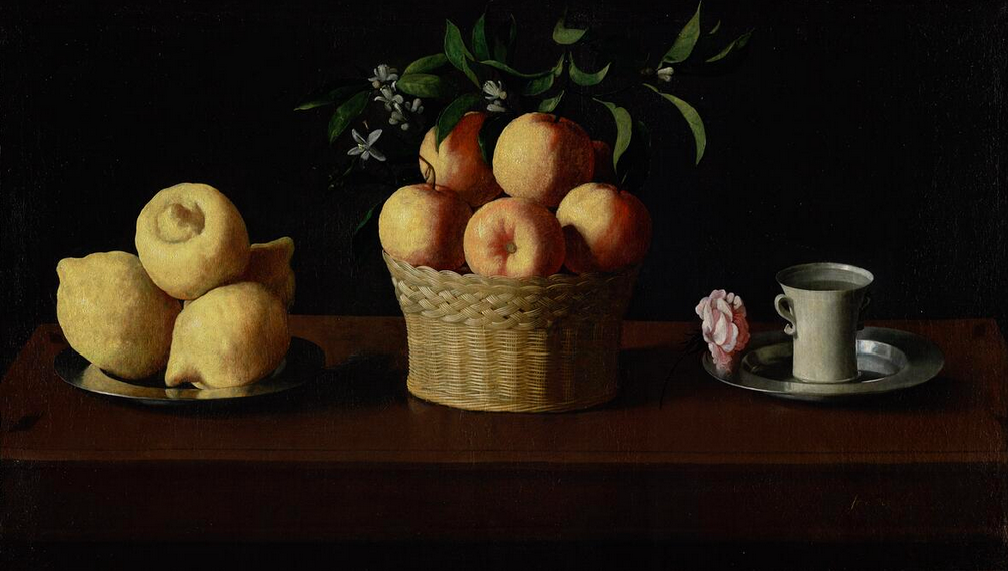
Still Life with Lemons, Oranges and a Rose, by Francisco de Zurbarán, 1633. Indoor citrus trees were popular in this era.

During the Renaissance (15th–16th centuries), plant collectors and affluent merchants from Italy, the Netherlands and Belgium imported plants from Asia Minor and the East Indies. Creeping groundsel was introduced in Malta and the rest of Europe in the 15th century as an ornamental plant.

In the 17th century, fascination with exotic plants grew among the aristocracy of France and England. Inventor and writer Sir Hugh Platt published Garden of Eden in 1660, a book that directed indoor plant growing methods. Wealthy British households purchased imported fruit trees, especially citrus trees, to grow in specialized orangeries. Less wealthy people would also grow plants, especially flowers, indoors. Orange trees became less fashionable as international commerce in oranges became more widespread. Succulents, such as aloes, were also cultivated.

=== 18th century ===
In the early 18th century, windows in London became wider and brighter, expanding the opportunities for the lower classes to grow plants indoors.

The expansion of European colonialism brought Europeans into contact with a wide variety of new plants, especially tropical plants more suited to growing as houseplants. Explorers and botanists brought over 5,000 species to Europe from South America, Africa, Asia and Australia.

Forcing plants to bloom out of season, especially bulbs, grew in popularity during the 18th century. The decorative pot or cachepot specifically for growing houseplants (as opposed to a simple terracotta pot, or a decorative vase) was developed in this era as ceramic manufacturing took off.

Plant breeding developed in the late 17th and 18th centuries. These innovations were drawn and presented in the botanical gardens and in private court collections. At the end of the 18th century, flower tables became part of the salons. Furthermore, nurseries were flourishing in the 18th century, which stocked thousands of plants, including citrus, jasmines, mignonette, bays, myrtles, agaves and aloes.

=== 19th century ===
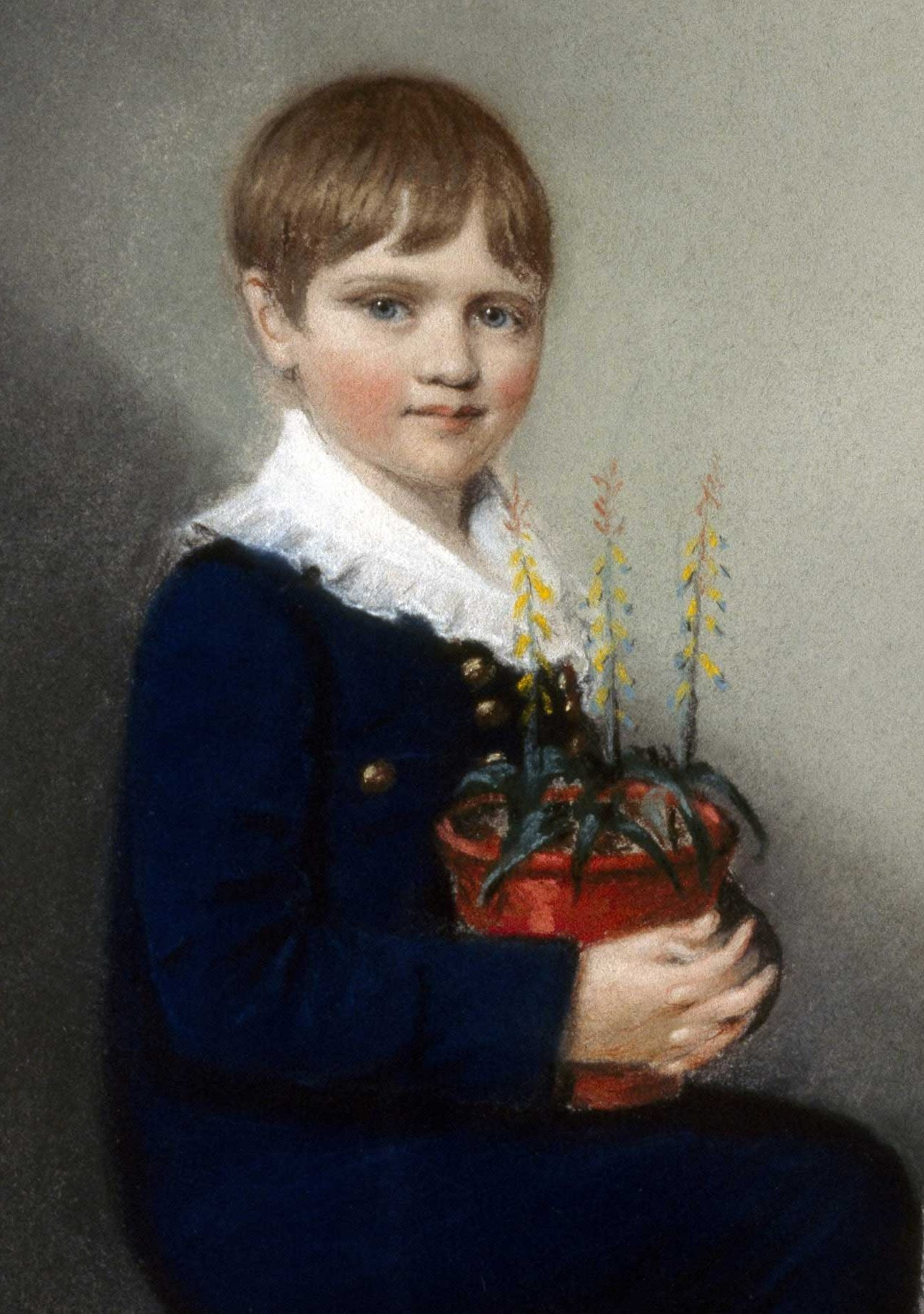
The earliest portrait of Charles Darwin, 1816, holding a potted houseplant

The Victorian era saw the first use of houseplants by the middle class, who perceived them as a symbol of social status and moral value. Some foliage plants which tolerated the typical gloomy and snug environment inside a Victorian house became popular. The quintessential Victorian plants were palms (such as kentia palms and parlour palms), the cast iron plant, and ferns. Ferns were grown in Wardian cases, an early type of terrarium. Geraniums were often placed on window ledges and in drawing rooms and were the most affordable houseplant for the average Briton.

In 1818, orchids were introduced to Europe when they were used as packing material for the shipment of other rare plants. German ivy was introduced in the United States sometime in the 19th century as a houseplant.

Other typical Victorian houseplants included mop-head chrysanthemums and yuccas.

At the end of the 19th century, the range already included begonias, cineraria, clivia, cyclamen and flamingo flowers, but also leafy ornamental plants such as silver fir, ornamental asparagus, lilium, snake plant, and rubber tree.

=== 20th century ===
In the early 20th century, there was a turn against houseplants as they were seen as dated relics of the cluttered Victorian era. When there were houseplants, the more architecturally shaped cacti and succulents were the most common. In the 1920s, commercial houseplant production began in California, focused on the Kentia palm and the pothos, later expanding to include Philodendron and Araucaria species in the 1940s.

During World War II, houseplants became more common in offices, which began to more closely resemble the domestic environment as more women entered the workforce.

By 1960, Florida produced more than 55% of American houseplants, and has since remained the main producer of houseplants for the American market. Philodendrons, rubber plants and geraniums were mainstays of the postwar era. Many plants entered the United States and the United Kingdom through the influence of Scandinavian design, which featured plants. Tropical plants like bromeliads, birds of paradise, and philodendrons were popular accents in tiki-themed spaces. The postwar years also saw a broader commercialization of houseplants. In the 1960s, plant care labels were introduced, and garden centers became ubiquitous in the 1970s.

A lush display of houseplants fit into the environmentalist and hippie movements in the 1970s; a large indoor garden is characteristic of 1970s design. Leafy plants were popular, particularly ferns and spider plants, often in macramé hanging planters. Monstera deliciosa, ferns, aloes and snake plants (Dracaena species, usually sold under their former genus of Sanseveria) were also popular. Terrariums and bottle gardens began to appear as well.

In the 1980s, houseplants were often limited to large, lush statement pieces, particularly in bathrooms. The rise of shopping malls with large skylights created a new place for plants to be grown. In the 1990s, moth orchids became trendy. The 1990s also brought a wave of interest in artificial plants.

=== 21st century ===
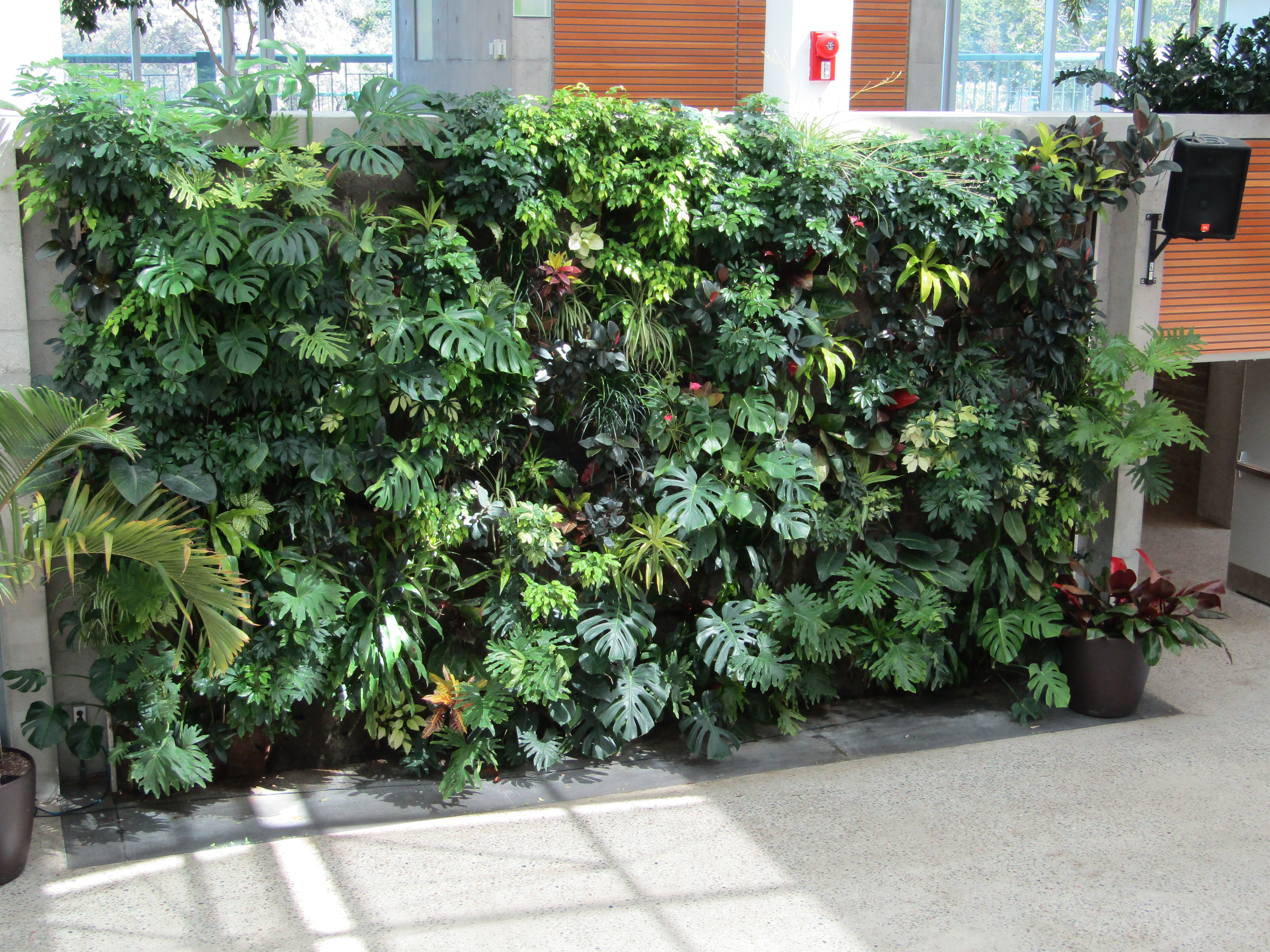
"Living walls", mass planted vertical gardens, emerged as a trend in 21st century interiors.

Beginning in the mid-to-late 2010s, fashionable plants from earlier decades were revitalized and popularized by social media, especially Instagram, with "plantstagram" becoming a major driver of trendy plants. In 2015, 5 million Americans took up plant-related hobbies. In 2017, 30% of American households purchased at least one houseplant.

Interest in houseplants exploded during the COVID-19 pandemic that began in early 2020. With people forced to spend more time indoors, many sought to fill their homes with houseplants. Plants were mentioned on Instagram an average of more than 3,000 times a day in July 2021 and the hashtag "#plantmom" had been used more than 2.6 million times. Plant sales in 2020 were at an all-time high, which brought concerns about the environmental impact of the industry.

Some of the most popular plants in the 2020s are the Monstera deliciosa and other aroids, as well as the fiddle-leaf fig. This has also seen a larger interest in growing plants with interesting or attractive forms or foliage, rather than focusing solely on flowers.

== Production ==
Houseplants are obtained either by collecting wild specimens of plants or by cultivating them in controlled environments such as greenhouses and commercial nurseries. While wild collection remains a source of some houseplants, it poses a significant threat to many species, particularly those with limited native ranges. Plants like cacti, succulents, and carnivorous species, especially Venus flytraps, are particularly vulnerable to over harvesting. This practice can destabilize natural ecosystems and reduce biodiversity, leading to conservation concerns.

Most plants grown for the houseplant trade are cultivated in nurseries, where they are raised in optimal conditions designed to promote healthy growth. These plants are often propagated through various methods, including traditional seed planting, cutting propagation, and, increasingly, tissue culture techniques. Tissue culture, which involves growing plants from small tissue samples in a sterile environment, allows for rapid production of disease-free plants and is especially useful for plants that are difficult to propagate by other means.

Transplanting is an essential part of the growing process for many houseplants. As plants grow, they often outgrow their original containers and need to be transferred to larger pots to accommodate their root systems. This process is crucial for maintaining healthy growth and ensuring that plants have sufficient space to develop robust root structures. when transplanting, care must be taken to avoid damaging the plant's roots and to ensure that the new pot has proper drainage. The timing of transplanting also plays a key roles in a plant's overall health, usually, it's done during the plant's active growing season to minimize stress.

For tropical plants, which make up a significant portion of the houseplant market, specialized care is needed to mimic their antic environments. Tropical vegetation thrives in warm, humid conditions and requires careful attention to temperature, light, and moisture levels. Some of the most popular tropical houseplants include varieties like monstera, philodendron, and various species of ferns. These plants are often propagated through cuttings or by dividing clumps of roots when transplanting, ensuring that the new plants have established root systems.

In terms of commercial production, the United States remains one of the largest producers of houseplants, with a significant portion still coming from Florida, known for its ideal climate for growing tropical plants. Similarly, the Netherlands plays a pivotal role in the European houseplant market, producing approximately one billion houseplants annually to meet the growing demand.

As the houseplant industry grows, sustainable practices in both plant production and sourcing have become more important, especially with the increasing popularity of rare and exotic tropical plants. By adopting environmentally responsible techniques, such as ethical propagation and avoiding wild collection, nurseries and growers can help ensure that houseplants continue to be available without further jeopardizing their natural habitats.

== Effects of houseplants ==
=== Air quality ===
Although houseplants are commonly considered to have an active, positive effect on indoor air quality, much of the non-academic reporting on the subject is based on experiments involving the removal of volatile organic compounds (VOCs) from the air, the evidence for which is unclear.

The 1989 NASA Clean Air Study was set up to research ways to clean the air in sealed environments such as space stations. This included an early study on the ability of potted plants to remove VOCs, which concluded that plants, specifically a combination of their roots and the soil microorganisms, were highly effective. However, this study tested plants in ways which are not representative of an indoor environment; in sealed chambers and with highly elevated levels of the VOCs benzene, trichloroethylene and formaldehyde. Subsequent studies have confirmed the combined role of soil and roots and showed that they were effective at cleaning in higher VOC concentrations, but only at lower concentrations after the process had been "kick-started" by a higher level of exposure. Others have shown that it is possible to artificially enrich the soil directly with VOC-degrading bacteria and achieve the same result, and posited that exposure to high VOC levels (or low levels but in bursts) during experiments and the subsequent increase in such bacteria may have been a cause of the large differences seen in the results of various studies. A 2019 review paper calculated that it would require between 10 and 1000 houseplants per square meter to achieve the same level of VOC removal as occurs from passive exchange between indoor and outdoor air.

Houseplants do have a statistically significant effect on the concentrations of both carbon monoxide and carbon dioxide in normal indoor environments, reducing carbon dioxide levels by 10–25% and carbon monoxide levels by up to 90%.

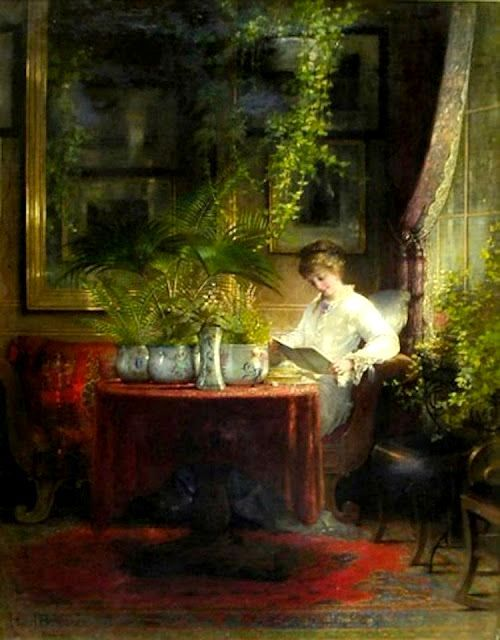
Hein Burgers, Young lady reading 1873

=== Human well-being ===
There are also many claimed psychological and physiological benefits to having houseplants. A 2022 systematic review with some meta-analyses included 42 studies which together measured the following human functions to study the benefits of indoor plants:

Physiology:

- Reaction time
- Pain tolerance
- Skin and body temperature
- Blood pressure, heart rate, heart rate variability, blood saturation, blood volume pulse and power spectral density
- Respiratory rate
- Cortisol level, galvanic skin response (electrodermal activity)
- Salivary amylase activity
- Critical flicker fusion frequency

Cognition:

- Reaction time
- Performance on various tasks: sorting, productivity, association, reading, information processing, vigilance, reading span, digit span, and the stroop task
- Neurobehavioral functioning assessment
- Brain activity
- Eye movement
- Academic grades

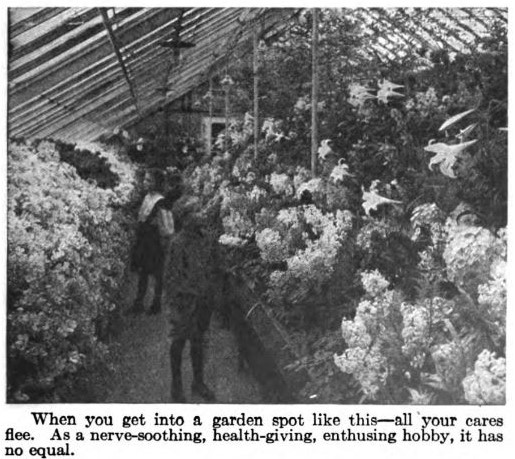
People have long ascribed psychological benefits to growing plants; this 1915 caption states that "all your cares flee. As a nerve-soothing, health-giving, enthusing hobby, it has no equal."

Behavior:

- Pain tolerance and pain killer consumption
- Sick leave, workplace misconduct

Health:

- Pain tolerance
- Pain killer consumption
- Sick leave
- Hospitalization days

Most but not all studies found a positive effect of plants. Each of the above functions was found to be influenced positively by the majority of the studies which measured it. The authors only had enough good-quality comparable data to synthesize six areas, from which they confirmed a statistically significant improvement only in diastolic blood pressure and academic performance.

A critical review of the experimental literature concluded in 2009:

The reviewed studies suggest that indoor plants can provide psychological benefits such as stress-reduction and increased pain tolerance. However, they also showed substantial heterogeneity in methods and results. We therefore have strong reservations about general claims that indoor plants cause beneficial psychological changes. It appears that benefits are contingent on features of the context in which the indoor plants are encountered and on characteristics of the people encountering them.

Houseplants can offer minor recovery from stress when instituted as part of an environment. The presence of a houseplant in an office setting can also increase productivity. A 2004 controlled study discovered that houseplants could improve mental focus, stabilize mood, and raise psychological motivation when present in otherwise unadorned environments.

== List of common houseplants ==
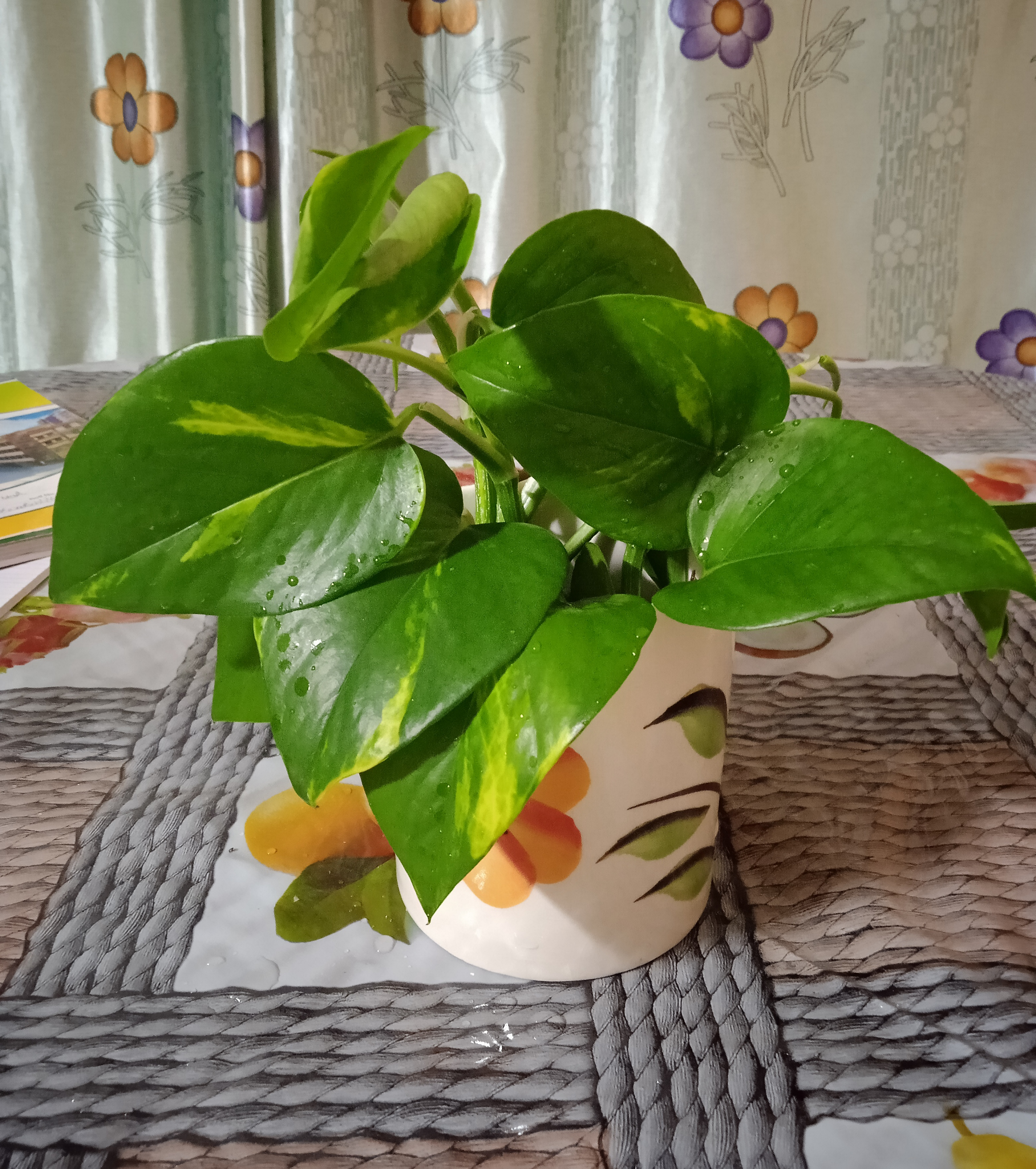
Epipremnum aureum or Pothos is one of the most common houseplants and has many variegated forms.

=== Tropical and subtropical ===
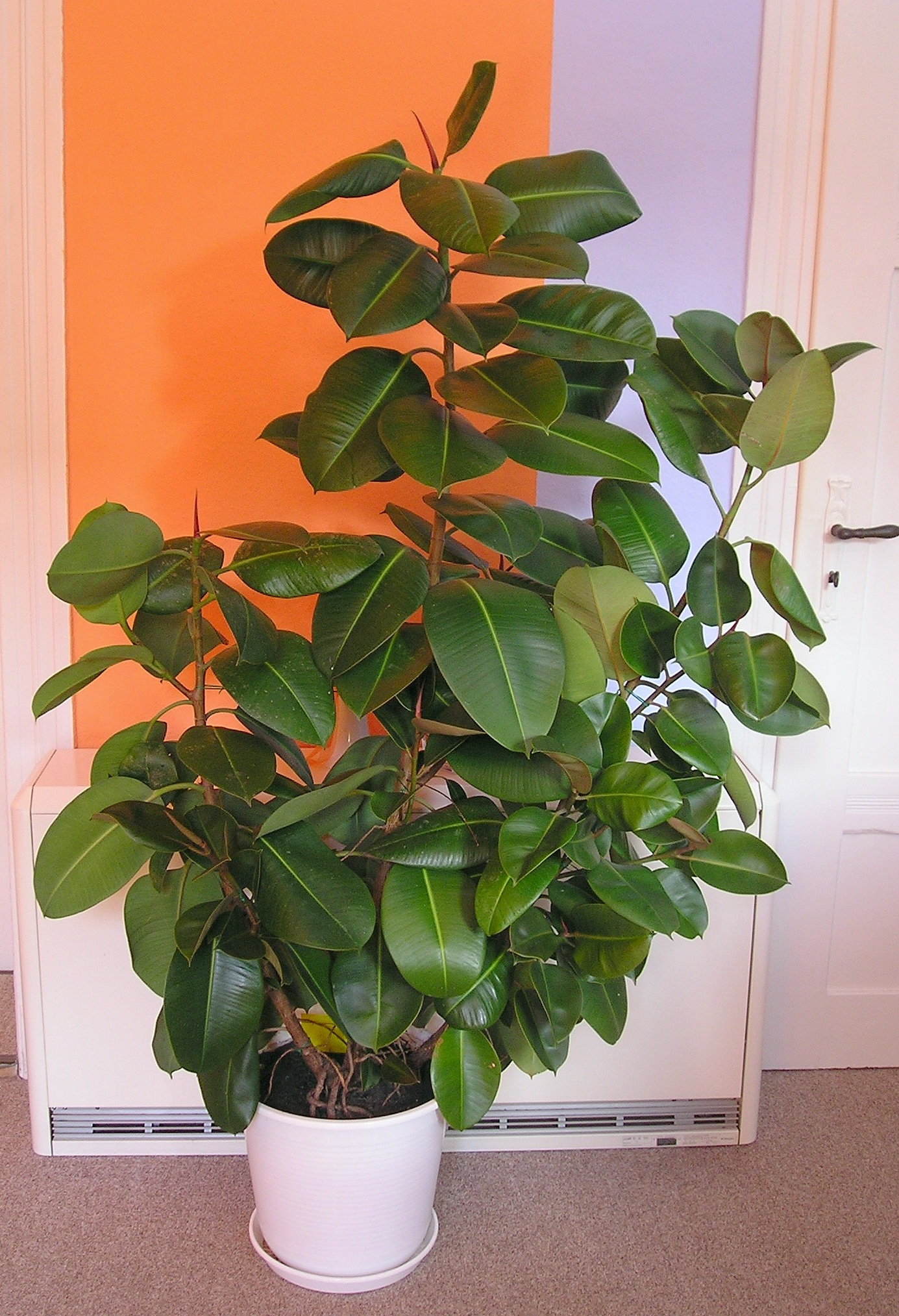
Ficus elastica, or the rubber plant, is a common house plant but is also a tree which can grow up to 30–40 metres (98–131 ft) tall in the wild.

- Aglaonema (Chinese evergreen)
- Alocasia and Colocasia spp. (elephant ear)
- Anthurium spp.
- Aphelandra squarrosa (zebra plant)
- Araucaria heterophylla (Norfolk Island pine)
- Aspidistra elatior (cast iron plant)
- Begonia species and cultivars
- Bromeliaceae (bromeliads, including air plants)
- Calathea, Goeppertia and Maranta spp. (prayer plants)
- Chlorophytum comosum (spider plant)
- Citrus (compact cultivars such as the Meyer lemon)
- Ctenanthe burle-marxii (fishbone prayer plants)
- Cyclamen
- Dieffenbachia (dumbcane)
- Epipremnum aureum (pothos)
- Ferns and plants treated like ferns, such as Asparagus aethiopicus (asparagus fern) and Nephrolepis exaltata (Boston fern)
- Beaucarnea recurvata (Ponytail palm)
- Ficus spp., including Ficus benjamina (weeping fig), Ficus elastica (rubber plant) and Ficus lyrata (fiddle-leaf fig)
- Hoya spp.
- Orchidaceae (orchid) spp.
- Peperomia spp.
- Palms, such as Chamaedorea elegans (parlor palm) and Dypsis lutescens (areca palm),
- Philodendron spp.
- Monstera species (Swiss cheese plants)
- Musa spp. (bananas)
- Ensete spp. (ensets)
- Musella (Yellow banana)
- Heptapleurum arboricola (umbrella plant)
- Sinningia speciosa (gloxinia)
- Spathiphyllum (peace lily)
- Stephanotis floribunda (Madagascar jasmine)
- Streptocarpus, including Streptocarpus sect. Saintpaulia (African violets)
- Tradescantia zebrina (purple wandering Jew)
- Pilea peperomioides (lefse or UFO plant)
- Scindapsus pictus (satin pothos)

=== Succulents ===
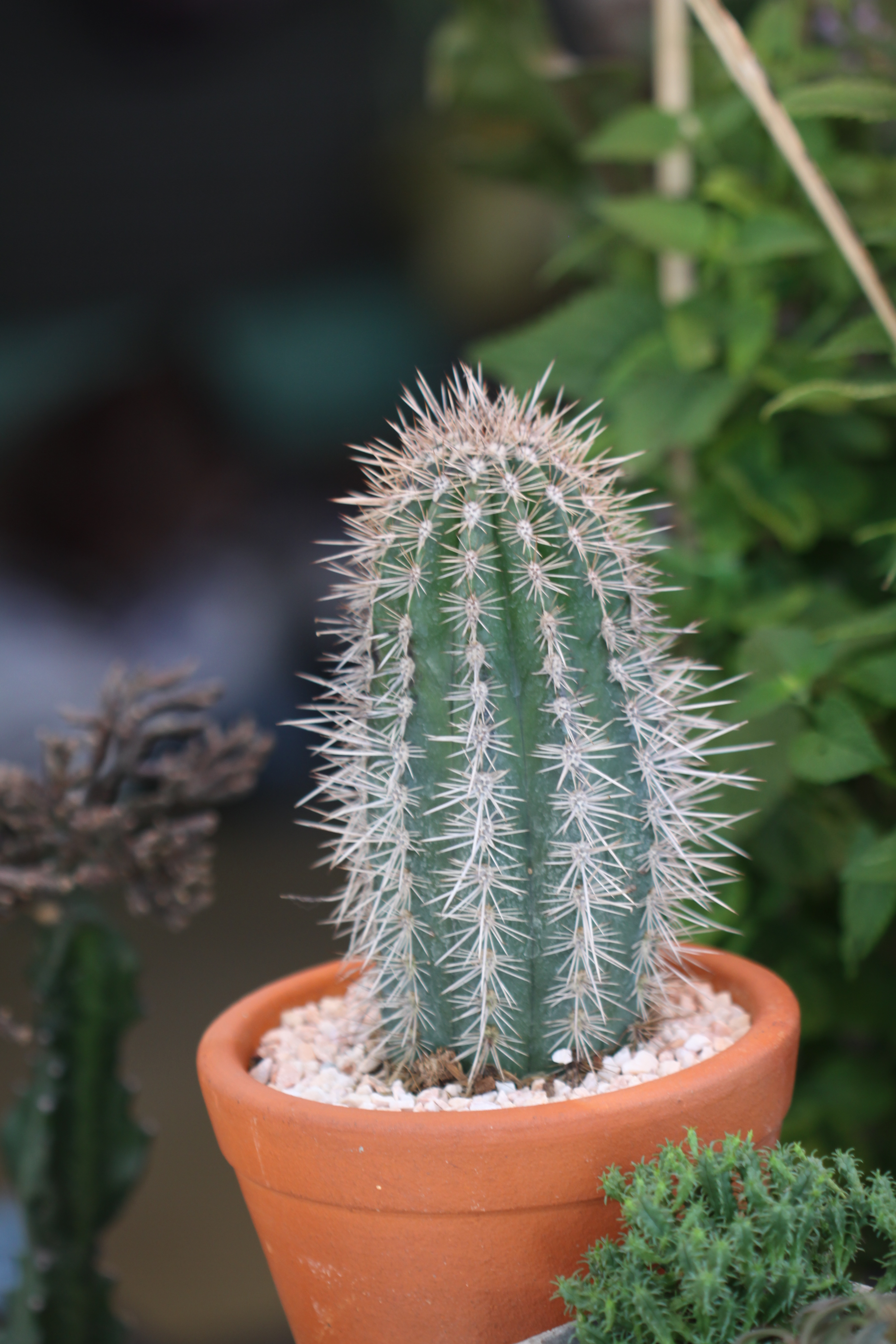
There are many species of cacti and succulents that stay small enough to do well as houseplants.

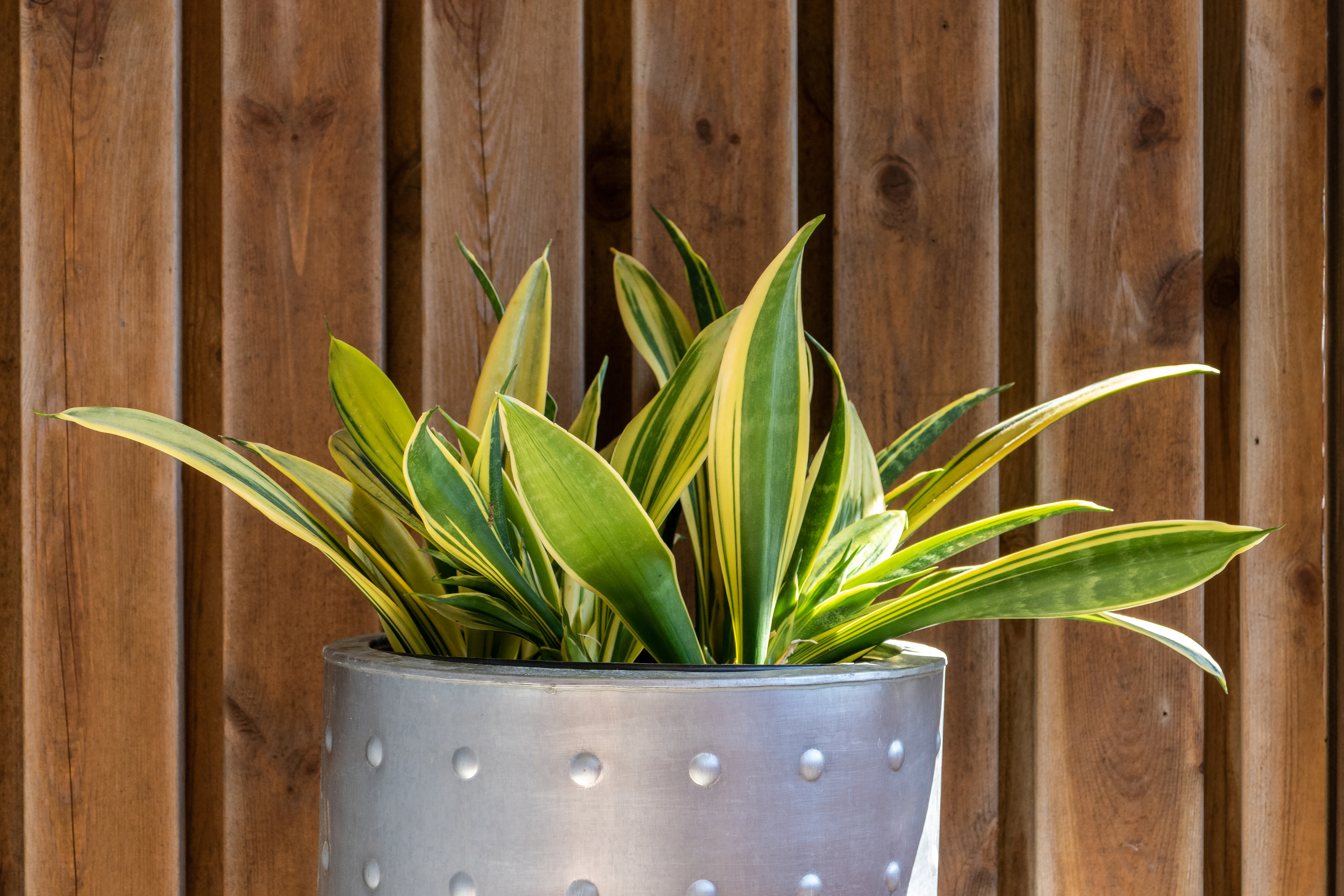
Snake plant, Dracaena (formerly Sansevieria) trifasciata, is known as one of the toughest and most common houseplants.

- Aloe spp. including Aloe vera
- Cactaceae (cacti)
  - Epiphyllum (orchid cacti)
  - Mammillaria
  - Opuntia (paddle cacti, including the prickly pear)
  - Zygocactus (Christmas cactus)
  - Gymnocalycium mihanovichii (chin cactus)
- Ceropegia woodii (string of hearts)
- Crassula ovata (jade plant)
- Echeveria spp.
- Haworthia spp.
- Dracaena spp., including plants formerly in the genus Sansevieria, such as the snake plant or mother-in-law's tongue, Dracaena trifasciata.
- Bowiea (climbing onion)
- Senecio angulatus (creeping groundsel)
- Curio rowleyanus (string of pearls)
- Yucca spp.
- Dudleya (liveforevers)
- Dracaena sanderiana (lucky bamboo)
- Kalanchoe spp. including Kalanchoe blossfeldiana, Kalanchoe daigremontiana, and Kalanchoe tomentosa.
- Portulacaria afra (elephant bush)
- Xerosicyos (silver dollar vines)

=== Carnivorous plants ===
- Drosera (sundews)
- Dionaea muscipula (Venus flytrap)
- Pinguicula (Butterworts)
  Flowering pinguicula pirouette, grown under grow lights inside a crystal dish with inert substrate.

=== Forced bulbs ===
Many forced bulbs are also temperate.

- Crocus
- Hippeastrum (amaryllis)
- Hyacinthus (hyacinth)
- Narcissus (narcissus or daffodil)

=== Temperate plants ===
- Hedera helix (English ivy)
- Saxifraga stolonifera (strawberry begonia)

== See also ==
- Indoor bonsai
