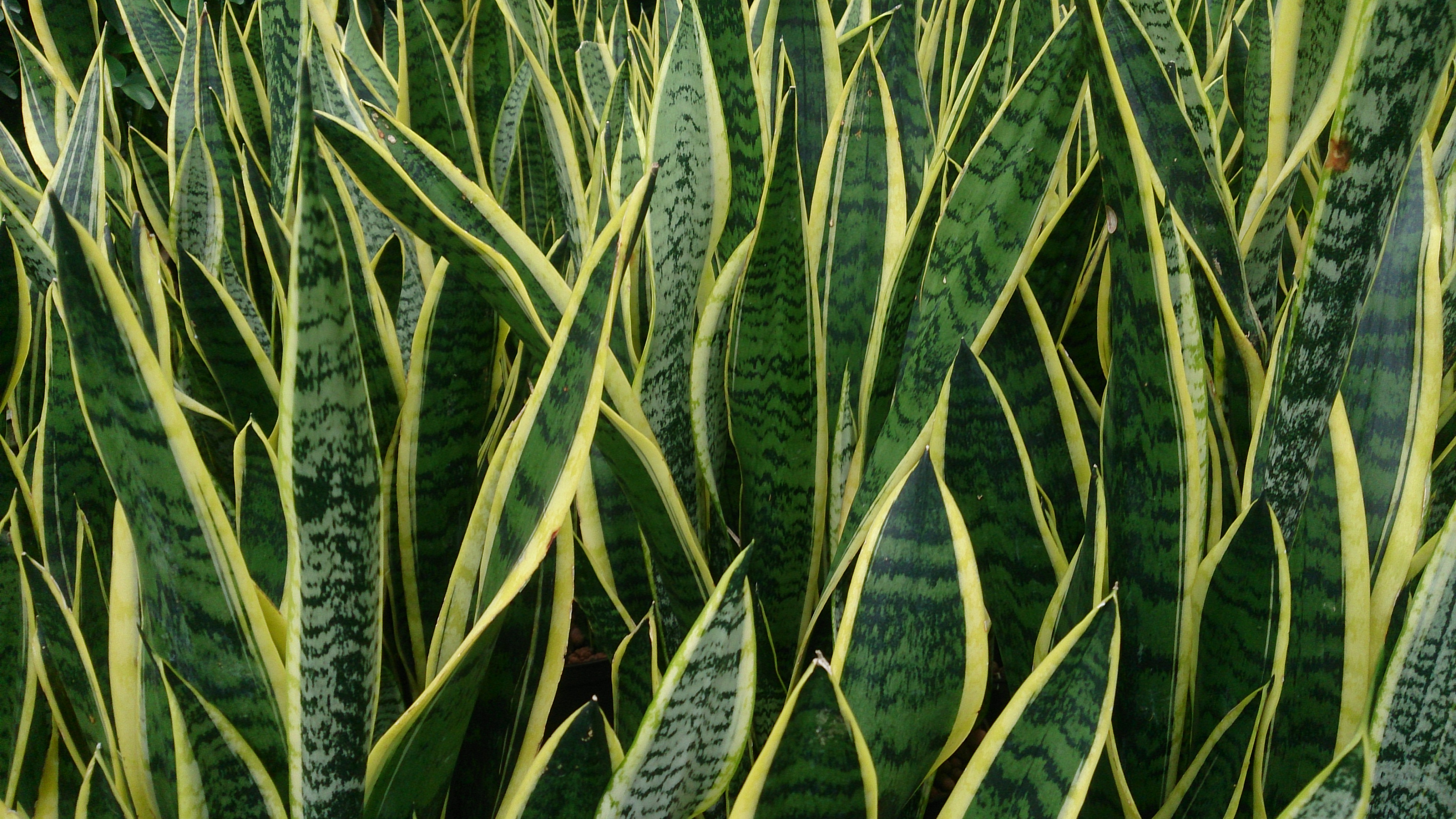
- A variegated cultivar, 'Laurentii'

Scientific classification
- Kingdom: Plantae
- Clade: Tracheophytes
- Clade: Angiosperms
- Clade: Monocots
- Order: Asparagales
- Family: Asparagaceae
- Subfamily: Convallarioideae
- Genus: Dracaena
- Species: D. trifasciata

Binomial name
- Dracaena trifasciata (Prain) Mabb.

Synonyms
- Sansevieria aureovariegata Mottet; Sansevieria jacquinii N.E.Br.; Sansevieria laurentii De Wild.; Sansevieria trifasciata Prain.

= Dracaena trifasciata =

Species of flowering plant

Dracaena trifasciata is a species of flowering plant in the family Asparagaceae, native to tropical West Africa from Nigeria east to the Congo. It is most commonly known as the snake plant, Saint George's sword, mother-in-law's tongue (a name it shares with Dracaena hyacinthoides), and viper's bowstring hemp, among other names. Until 2017, it was known under the synonym Sansevieria trifasciata. This plant is often kept as a houseplant due to its non-demanding maintenance; they can survive with very little water and sun.

== Description ==
It is an evergreen perennial plant forming dense strands, spreading by way of its creeping rhizome, which is sometimes above ground, sometimes underground. Its stiff leaves grow vertically from a basal rosette. Mature leaves are dark green with light gray-green cross-banding and usually range from 70–90 centimetres (2.3–3.0 ft) long and 5–6 centimetres (2.0–2.4 in) wide, though it can reach heights above 2 m (6 ft) in optimal conditions.

The specific epithet trifasciata means "with three bundles".

The plant exchanges oxygen and carbon dioxide using the crassulacean acid metabolism process, which allows them to withstand drought. The microscopic pores on the plant's leaves, called the stomata and used to exchange gases, are opened only at night to prevent water from escaping via evaporation in the hot sun.

To get this plant to go into bloom outside of its natural environment is difficult. Replicating its natural environment is possible. Its flowers vary from greenish white to cream-colored — some are fragrant at night, others not at all — and have a sticky texture.

Dracaena trifasciata is commonly called "mother-in-law's tongue", "Saint George's sword" or "snake plant", because of the shape and sharp margins of its leaves that resemble snakes. It is also known as the "viper's bowstring hemp", because it is one of the sources for plant fibers used to make bowstrings.

== Cultivation and uses ==
Like other members of its genus, D. trifasciata yields bowstring hemp, a strong plant fiber once used to make bowstrings.

It is now used predominantly as an ornamental plant, outdoors in warmer climates, and indoors as a houseplant in cooler climates. It is popular as a houseplant because it is tolerant of low light levels and irregular watering; during winter, it needs only one watering every few months. It will rot easily if overwatered. It is commonly recommended to beginners interested in cultivating houseplants for its easy care.

The NASA Clean Air Study found D. trifasciata has the potential to filter indoor air, removing four of the five main toxins involved in the effects of sick building syndrome. However, its rate of filtration is too slow for practical indoor use.

It can be propagated by leaf cuttings or by dividing the rhizome. The first method has the disadvantage that not all cultivars will maintain their variegation in the new plants.

D. trifasciata is considered by some authorities a potential weed in Australia. It is widely used as an ornamental in the tropics outdoors in pots and garden beds, and in temperate areas as an indoor plant.

The plant contains saponins which are mildly toxic to dogs and cats and can lead to gastrointestinal upset if consumed.

In South Africa, it is used to treat ear infections.

== Varieties and cultivars ==
Numerous cultivars have been developed, many of them for variegated foliage with yellow or silvery-white stripes on the leaf margins. Popular cultivars include 'Compacta', 'Goldiana', 'Hahnii', 'Laurentii', 'Silbersee', and 'Silver Hahnii'. 'Hahnii' was discovered in 1939 by William W. Smith Jr. in the Crescent Nursery Company, New Orleans, Louisiana. The 1941 patent was assigned to Sylvan Frank Hahn of Pittsburgh, Pennsylvania.

The variety D. trifasciata var. laurentii, together with the cultivars 'Bantel's Sensation' and 'Golden Hahni' have gained the Royal Horticultural Society's Award of Garden Merit.

Non-variegated forms of D. trifasciata are often incorrectly sold as Sansevieria zeylanica, which is a different species that is rarely cultivated.

== Cultural significance ==
In its native range in Africa, Dracaena trifasciata specimens with yellow stripes on the leaf margins are associated with Ọya, the female orisha of storms. In Nigeria, the plant is commonly linked with Ògún, the orisha of war, and is used in rituals to remove the evil eye.

In Brazil, where it is known as espada de São Jorge ("Saint George's sword"), it is grown outside houses to ward off evil that might harm the home (as is Dracaena angolensis, Saint George's spear). The plant plays an important part in the Afro-Brazilian syncretic religion Umbanda, also representing the orisha Ogum (Ògún), as Ogum is syncretized with Saint George. Some yellow-edged varieties of D. trifasciata are called espada de Santa-Bárbara ("Sword of Saint Barbara") and are associated with Iansã, the Umbanda name for Ọya, Saint Barbara's syncretic orisha pair. These types are grown to protect against inclement weather.

This plant is visible on the porch in American Grant Wood's 1930 painting, American Gothic.

== Gallery ==
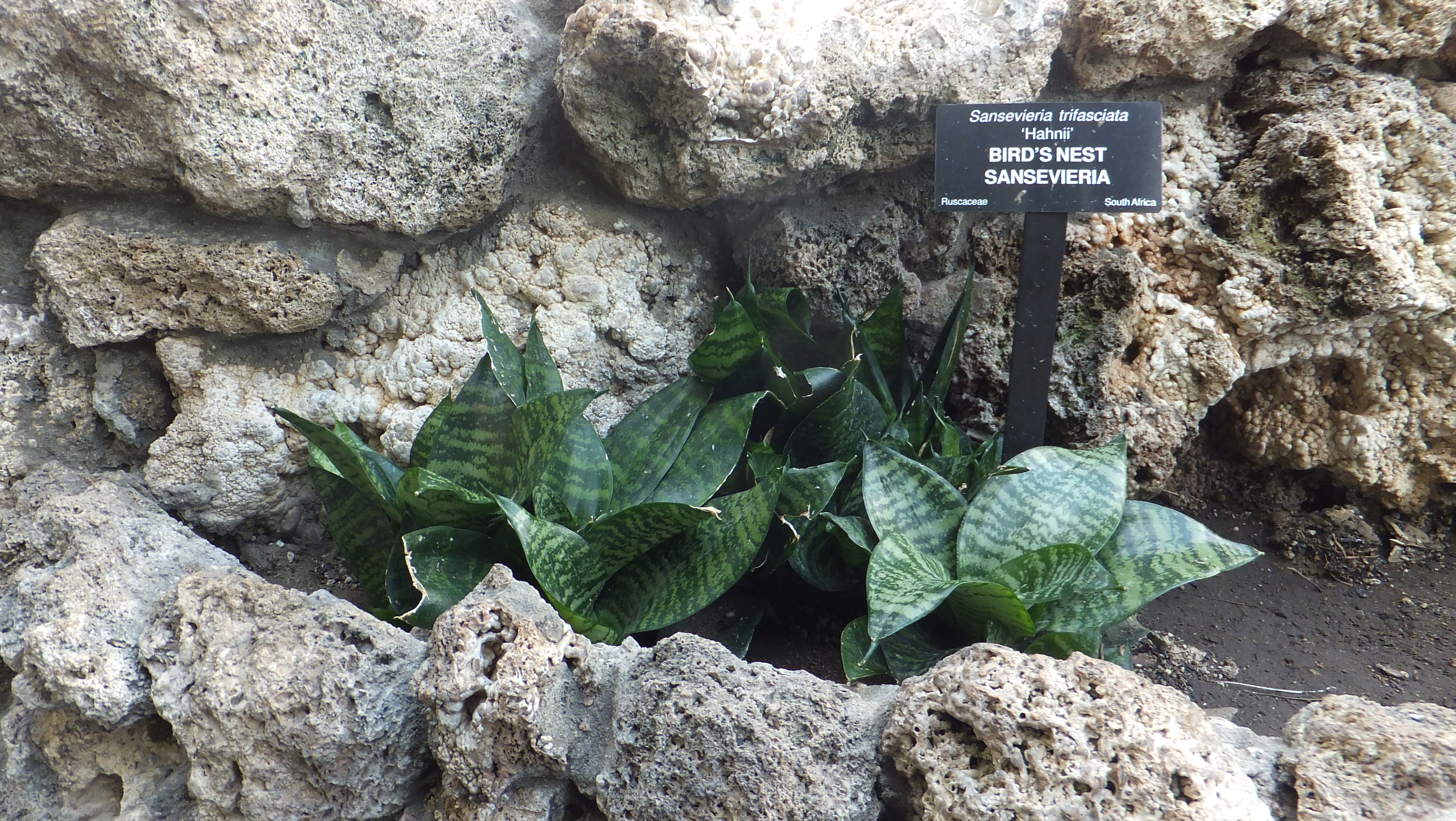
Dracaena trifasciata 'Hahnii', a dwarfed cultivar

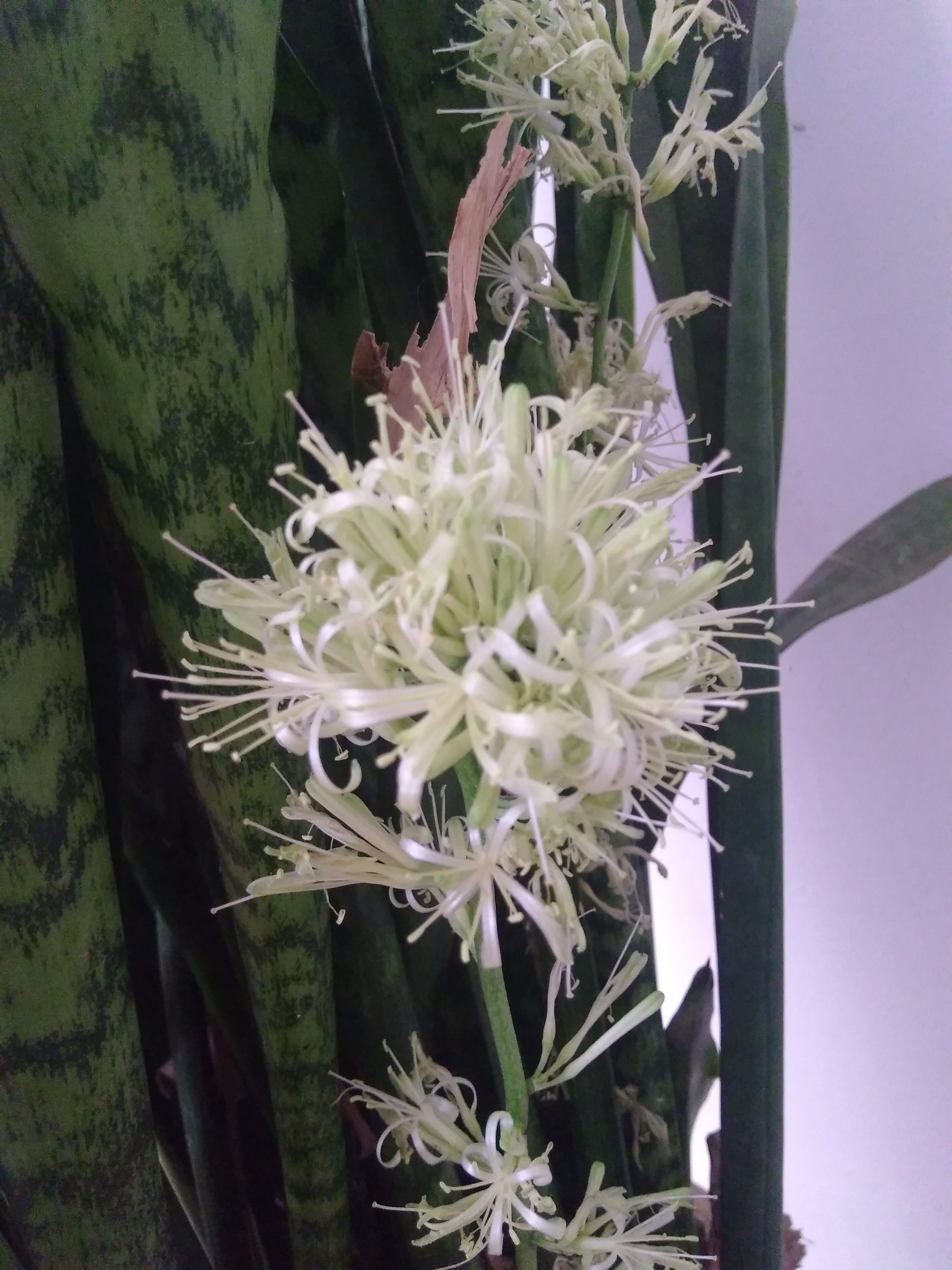
Fully developed and blooming inflorescence
