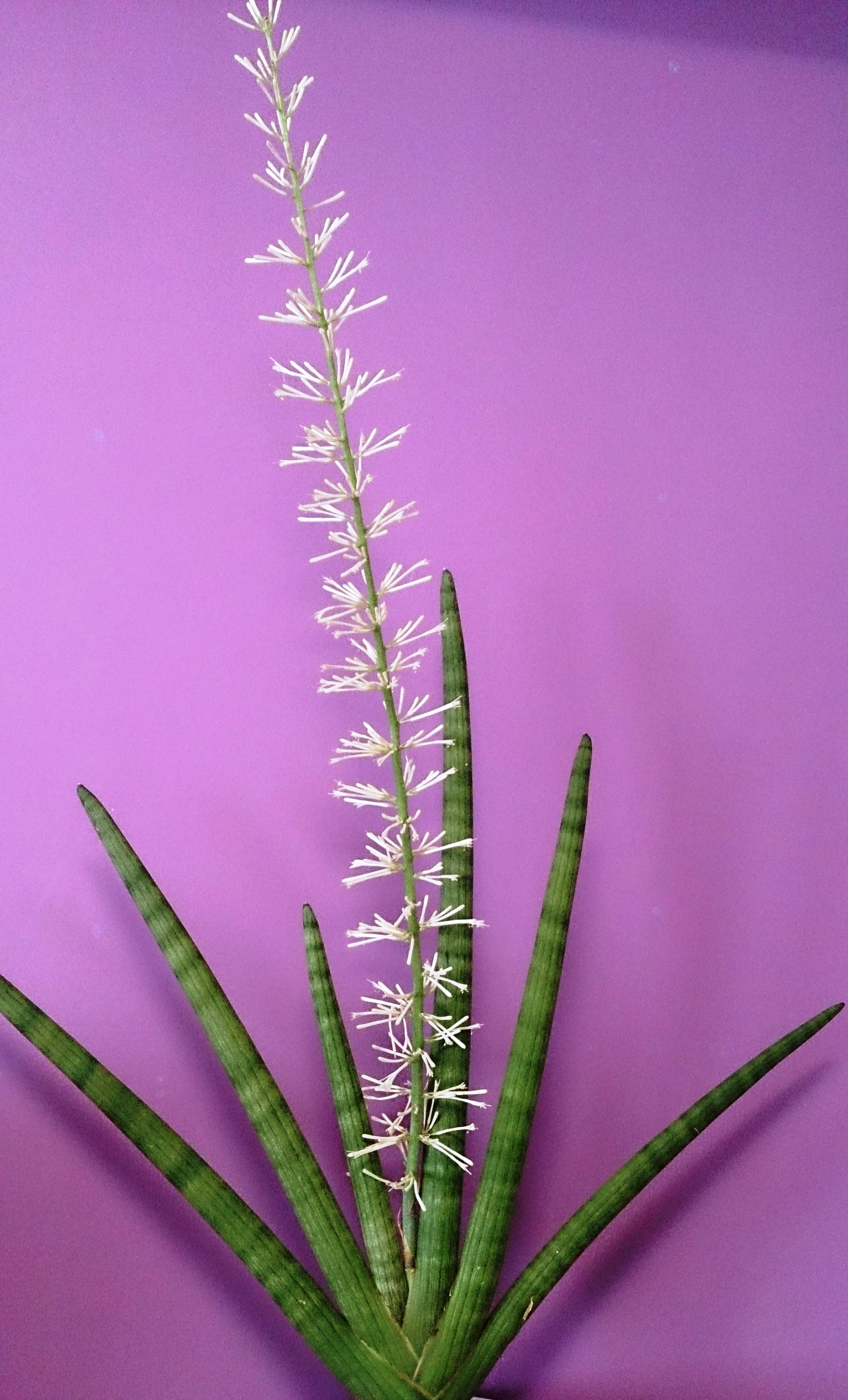

Scientific classification
- Kingdom: Plantae
- Clade: Tracheophytes
- Clade: Angiosperms
- Clade: Monocots
- Order: Asparagales
- Family: Asparagaceae
- Subfamily: Nolinoideae
- Genus: Dracaena
- Species: D. angolensis

Binomial name
- Dracaena angolensis (Welw. ex Carrière) Byng & Christenh.

Synonyms
- Acyntha cylindrica (Bojer ex Hook.) Kuntze; Cordyline cylindrica (Bojer ex Hook.) Britton; Sansevieria angolensis Welw. ex Carrière; Sansevieria cylindrica Bojer ex Hook.; Sansevieria livingstoniae Rendle

= Dracaena angolensis =

Species of flowering plant

Dracaena angolensis (synonym Sansevieria cylindrica), commonly known as African spear or the spear sansevieria, is a succulent plant native to Angola in Southern Africa. For years, it was placed within the genus Sansevieria (snake-plants), a specific name which is still used synonymously by some; in the 21st century, Sansevieria became part of Dracaena (dragon-trees), after improved testing methods, physical comparisons, and other analyses found sufficient commonalities between the two genera to warrant subsumption.

The genus Dracaena is a part of the Asparagaceae (asparagus family)—i.e., they are closely aligned with and related to such groups as the Asparagus, Agave, Beaucarnea (ponytail "palms"), Chlorophytum (spider-plants), Camassia, Dasylirion (sotols), Hesperaloe (Texan or red yuccas) and Yucca (Joshua trees).

== Description ==
Dracaena angolensis has striped, elongate, smooth, greenish-gray subcylindrical leaves. They are up to 3 cm (1 in) diameter and grow up to 2 m (7 ft) above soil. The spear sansevieria grows fan-shaped, with its stiff leaves growing from a basal rosette.

The species is interesting in having subcylindrical instead of strap-shaped leaves caused by a failure to express genes which would cause the cylindrical bud to differentiate dorsoventrally or produce a distinctive and familiar top and bottom surface to the leaf blade. The 3 cm (1 in) greenish-white tubular flowers are tinged with pink.

== Cultivation ==
The species is drought-tolerant and in cultivation requires water only about once every other week during the growing season. The species can be watered once a month during the winter months. The species was described by Wenceslas Bojer in 1837. Dracaena angolensis (under the synonym Sansevieria cylindrica) received its common name from a competition in a Dutch national newspaper. It is popular as an ornamental plant as it is easy to culture and take care of in a home if given bright sunlight and other required resources. In Brazil, where it is known as lança de São Jorge ("St. George's spear"), it is grown outside houses to ward off evil that might harm the home. The plant plays an important part in the Afro-Brazilian syncretic religion Umbanda, representing the orisha Ogum, as Ogum is syncretized with St. George.

== Gallery of varieties and cultivars ==
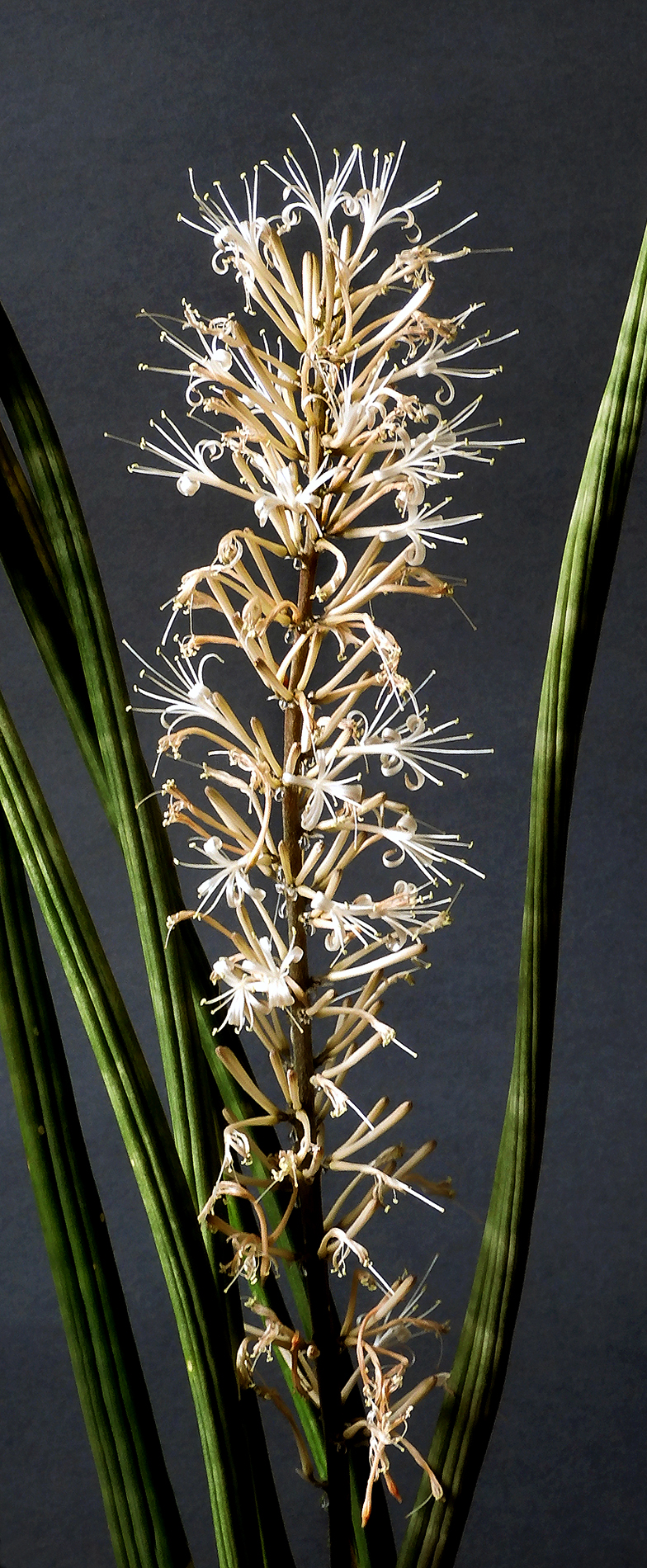
Blooming.

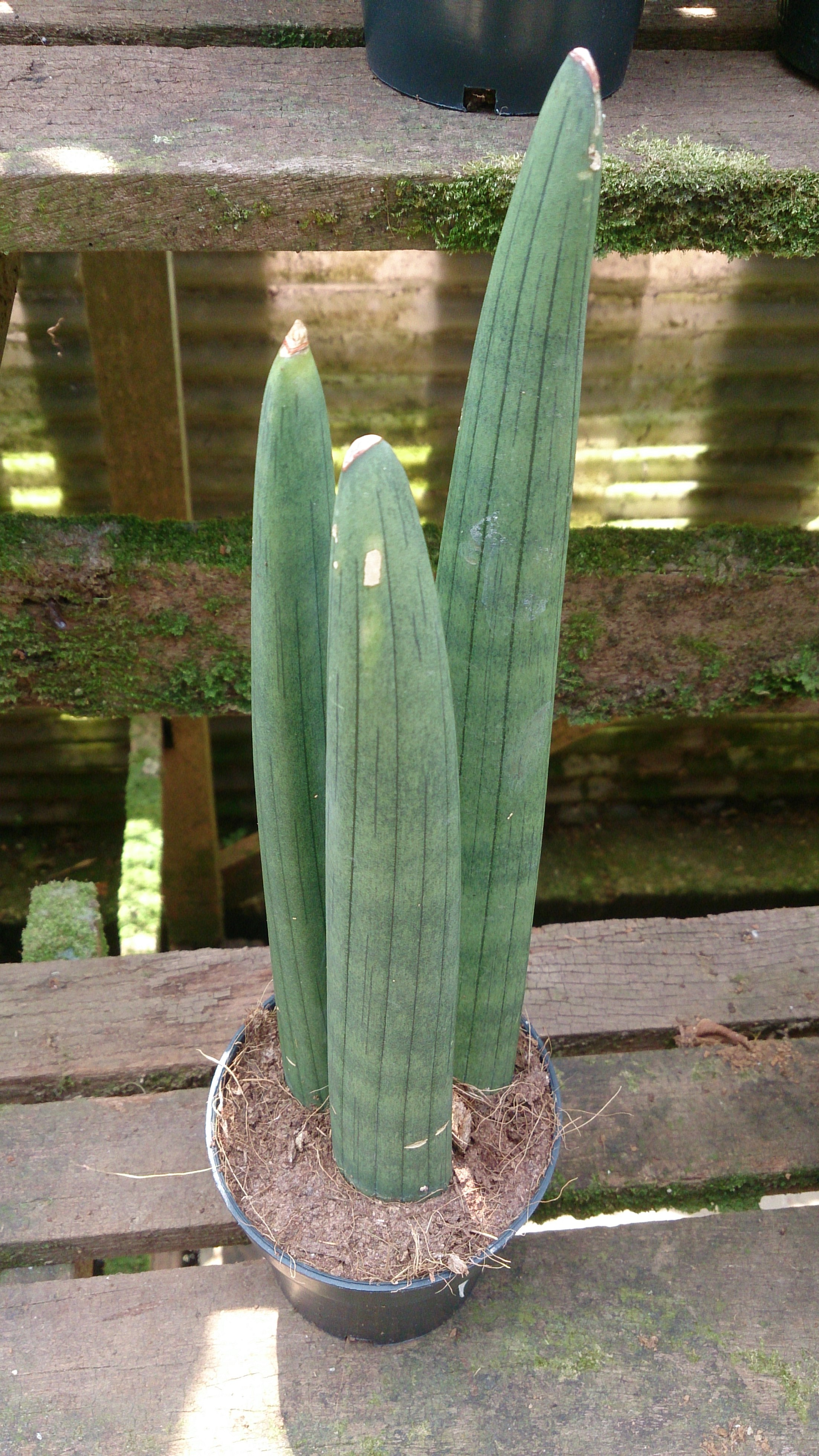

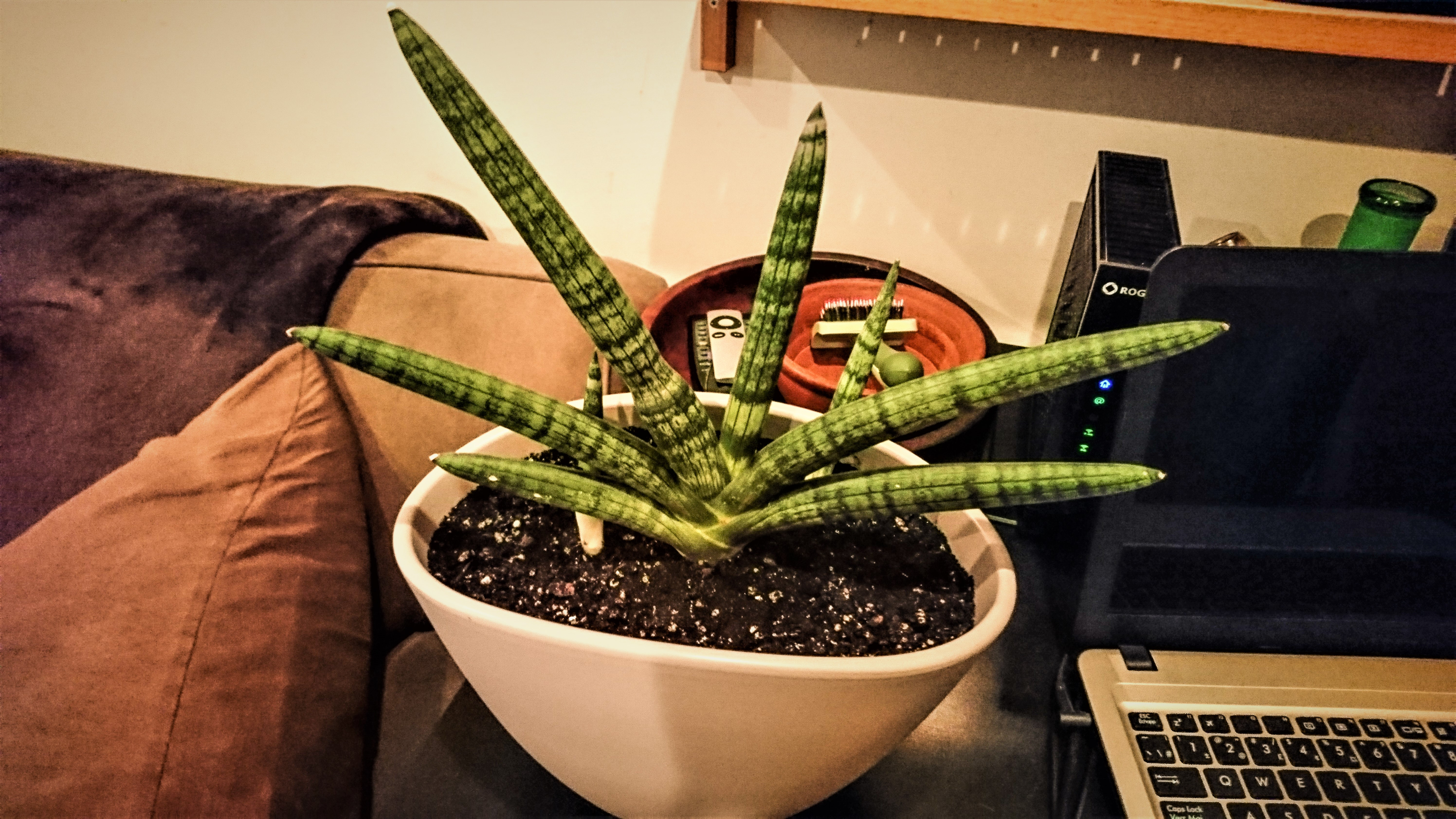
Kind known as "var. patula"

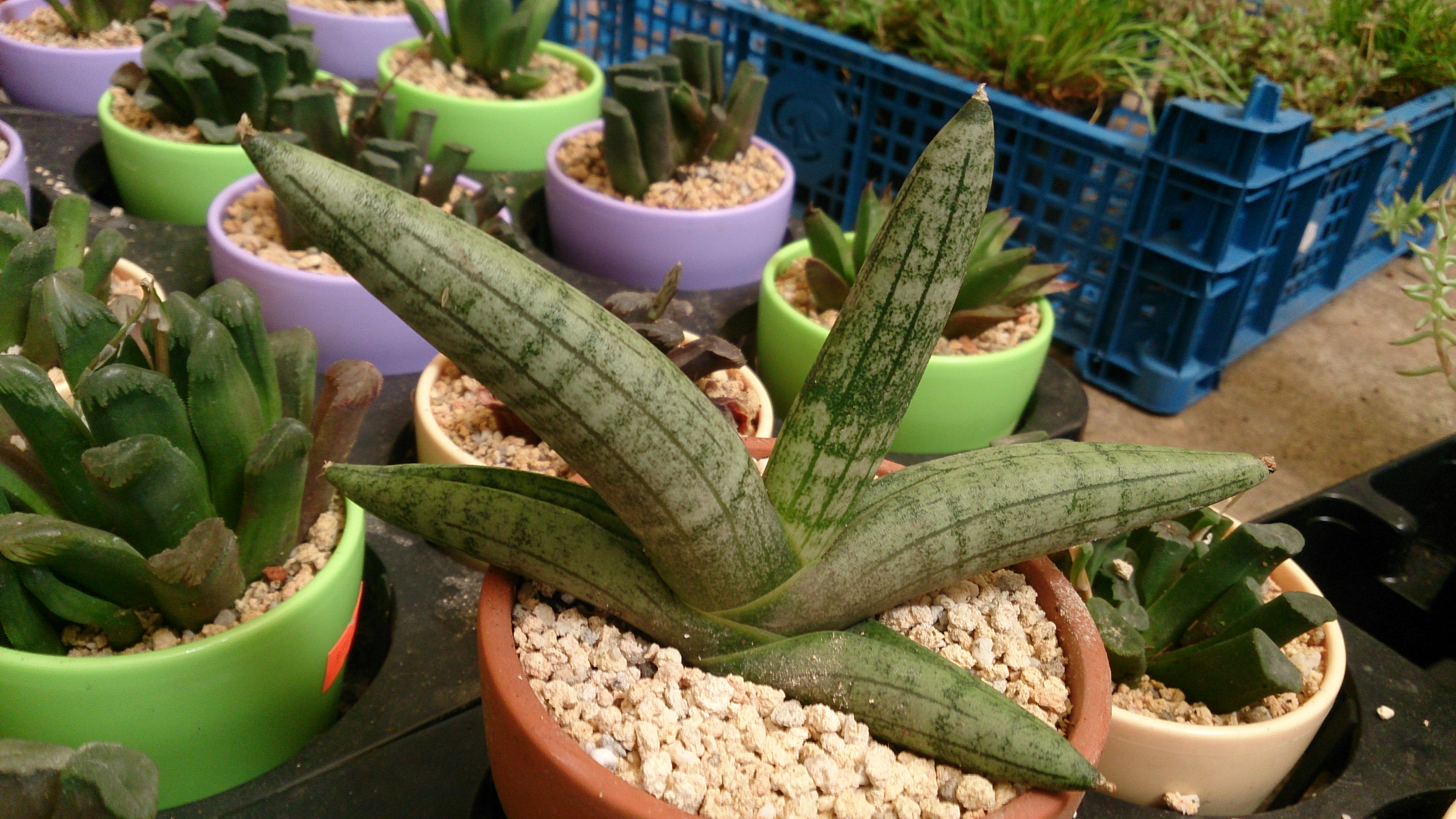
Cultivar 'Boncel'

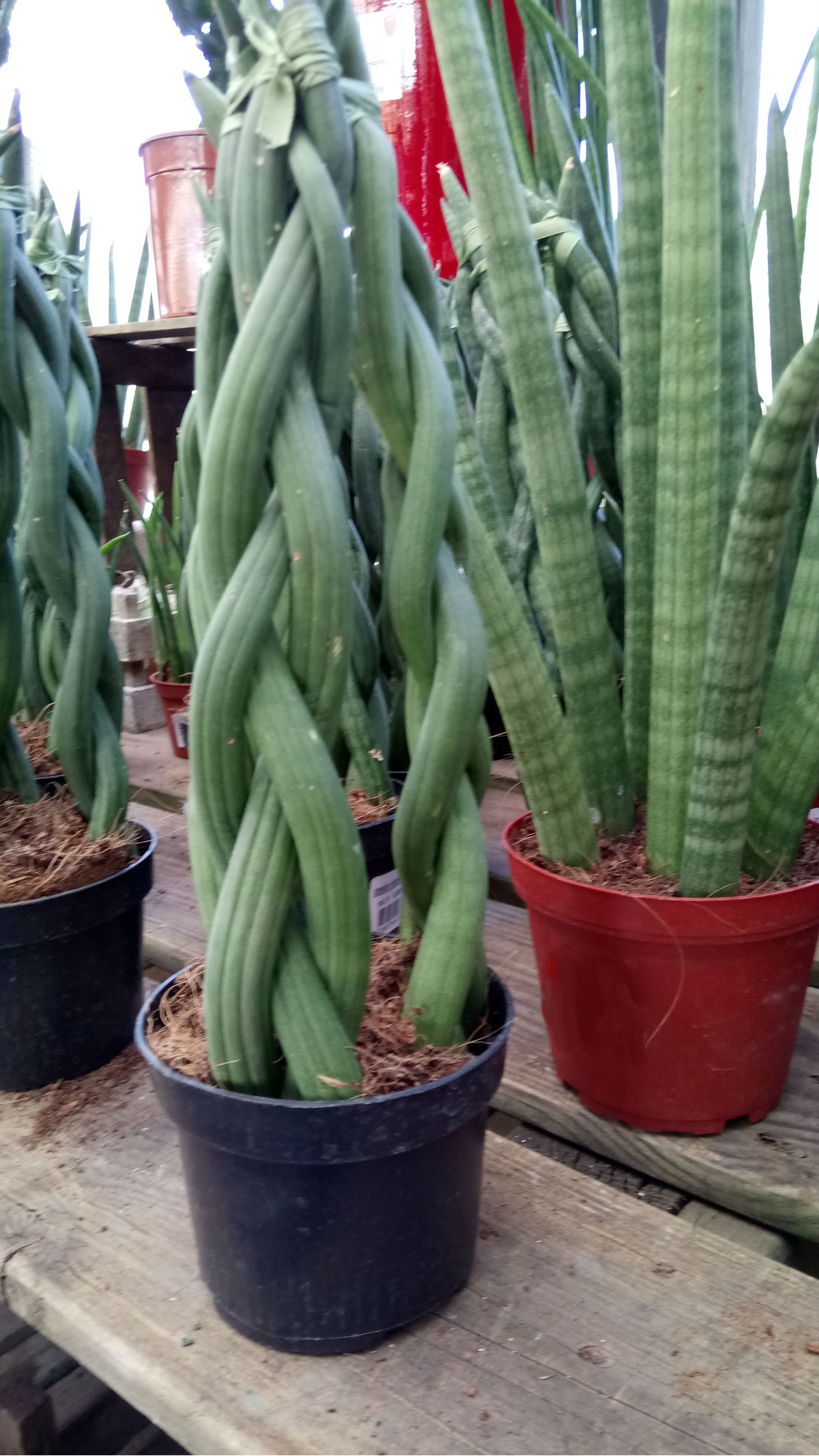
