= Split-leaf philodendron =

Split-leaf philodendron is a common name for several plants in the Araceae family, which may refer to:

- Monstera deliciosa, a species with lobed and perforated leaves bearing edible fruit
- Philodendron bipinnatifidum, a species with large pinnately-lobed leaves
