= Plantsman =

Enthusiastic and knowledgeable gardener

A plantsman is an enthusiastic and knowledgeable gardener (amateur or professional), nurseryman or nurserywoman. "Plantsman" can refer to a male or female person, though the terms plantswoman, or even plantsperson, are sometimes used. The word is sometimes said to be synonymous with "botanist" or "horticulturist", but that would indicate a professional involvement, whereas "plantsman" reflects an attitude to (and perhaps even an obsession with) plants. A horticulturist may be a plantsman, but a plantsman is not necessarily a horticulturist.

== Defining the word ==
In the first edition (June 1979) of The Plantsman (a specialist magazine, published by the Royal Horticultural Society from 1994 until June 2019, when it was announced that the title would be changed to The Plant Review), Sandra Raphael (then a senior editor in the Dictionary Department of the Oxford University Press) contributed a short article on the history and meaning of the word. Her first example came from an issue of the Gardeners' Chronicle of 1881, when it seemed to mean "A nurseryman, a florist" (in the early sense of "florist" as a grower and breeder of flowers, rather than the more recent meaning of someone who sells or arranges them). She added that a modern definition should point out that "plantsman"

"…is usually intended to mean a connoisseur of plants or an expert gardener."

In her article, Raphael also quotes botanist David McClintock (writing in the Botanical Society of the British Isles' BSBI News, December 1976) on how to distinguish a botanist from a plantsman, beginning with the simple definition:

"A plantsman is one who loves plants for their own sake and knows how to cherish them. This… concept… may include a botanist: it certainly includes a host of admirable amateurs who may not know what a chromosome looks like or what taxonomy means, but they know the growing plant, wild or cultivated, first-hand. To my mind they are the cream of those in the plant world, a fund of invaluable first-hand information." He stresses the value of practical experience, saying:
"It is much to be regretted that so few botanists, amateurs or professional, know even how to take cuttings or propagate a plant. How much better to do this, circumspectly, and so get to know the living plant better, than just press and dry the specimen."

== Notable plantsmen and women ==
John Tradescant the elder (ca 1570s–1638) and his son, John Tradescant the younger (1608–1662), must head the list of historic plantsmen. Charles de l'Ecluse, better known as Carolus Clusius (1526–1609), and Carl Linnaeus (1707–1778) are other examples. These early botanists, who certainly grew (and sometimes also collected) many of the plants they described, can therefore be described as plantsmen (though such a term did not exist in their lifetimes).

By contrast, adventurous plant-hunters such as David Douglas (1799–1834), who dedicated (and lost) his life to searching out and collecting plants from the wild, were seldom gardeners and rarely grew the plants they had collected, so perhaps do not count as plantsmen, despite their great knowledge and dedication. Augustine Henry (1857–1930) was a pioneering plant-collector in Western China in the late 19th century who became a professor of forestry in later life. On the other hand, EH Wilson (1876–1930), also famed for his work in China (to the extent that he was known as Ernest "Chinese" Wilson), began as a gardener and, after working at the Royal Botanic Gardens, Kew, became a plant collector, first for James Veitch & Sons (nurserymen) and later for the Arnold Arboretum.

Irish nurseryman William Baylor Hartland (1836–1912) specialised in daffodils in the late 19th century from his nursery in Cork. He was also an authority on apples. Because of their in-depth knowledge, specialist plant-breeders may be considered plantsmen in their own fields (though the term is often taken to imply a more encyclopaedic interest in a wide range of plants).

Influential garden writers such as William Robinson (1838–1935) and garden-designer Gertrude Jekyll (1843–1932) disseminated their knowledge of plants through their writing, as did a later generation of plant-lovers including Margery Fish (1892–1969) and Vita Sackville-West (1892–1962), whose garden at Sissinghurst Castle, created with her husband Harold Nicolson, is now owned by the National Trust and one of the most popular in Britain.

Reginald Farrer (1880–1920) was a notable plant-hunter and influential writer in the more specialised area of alpine plants and rock gardening.

== Modern plantsmen ==
Notable modern British plantsmen include Roy Lancaster, the late Christopher Lloyd of Great Dixter (1921–2006) and the late Beth Chatto (1923–2018). American nurserymen and plant-collectors who qualify for the title include plant-breeder Dan Heims of Terra Nova Nurseries (who styles himself a "hortiholic"), Dan Hinkley, co-founder of Heronswood (now an independent author, lecturer and horticultural consultant), and Tony Avent, owner of the renowned Plant Delights Nursery.

European candidates include the late Princess Greta Sturdza of Le Vasterival, near Dieppe; the late Robert and Jelena de Belder, the principal creators of Arboretum Kalmthout, Belgium; and influential Dutch garden designer Piet Oudolf, who has pioneered the use of "prairie-style" planting with bold drifts of perennials and grasses at gardens such as Scampston Hall, North Yorkshire and the RHS Garden, Wisley, Surrey in the UK and at Enköping in Sweden. Oudolf is designing a Garden of Remembrance for the victims of 9/11 in Battery Park (New York). Landscape architect Louis Benech of France is also a famous plantsman.
