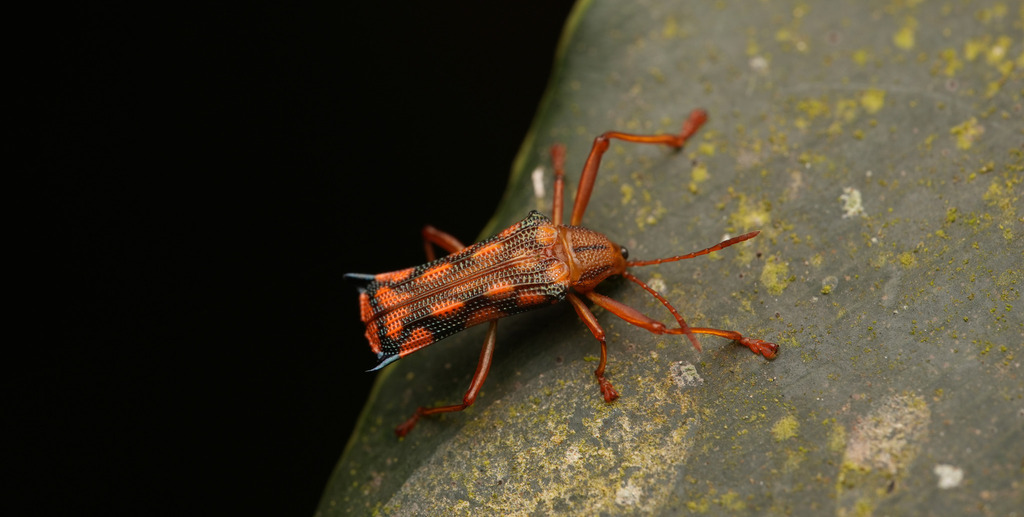

Scientific classification
- Kingdom: Animalia
- Phylum: Arthropoda
- Class: Insecta
- Order: Coleoptera
- Suborder: Polyphaga
- Infraorder: Cucujiformia
- Family: Chrysomelidae
- Genus: Sceloenopla
- Species: S. pretiosa

Binomial name
- Sceloenopla pretiosa (Baly, 1858)

Synonyms
- Cephalodonta pretiosa Baly, 1858; Cephalodonta juncta Weise, 1906

= Sceloenopla pretiosa =

Species of beetle

Sceloenopla pretiosa is a species of beetle of the family Chrysomelidae. It is found in Argentina, Brazil (Bahia, Rio de Janeiro, São Paulo) and Paraguay.

== Description ==
Adults are elongate, subdepressed and pale fulvous, with three longitudinal stripes on the thorax and the elytra metallic purple, the latter armed at the posterior angles with a large, flattened, very acute spine. Each elytron has eight irregular pale fulvous spots, confluent and covering nearly the whole surface.

== Life history ==
The recorded host plants for this species are Philodendron species (including Philodendron selloum), Esembeckia febrifuga and Anthurium species.
