= Heronswood =

Heronswood may refer to:

- Heronswood (botanical garden), a botanical garden in Washington, USA
- Heronswood, Victoria, a historic house in Victoria, Australia
