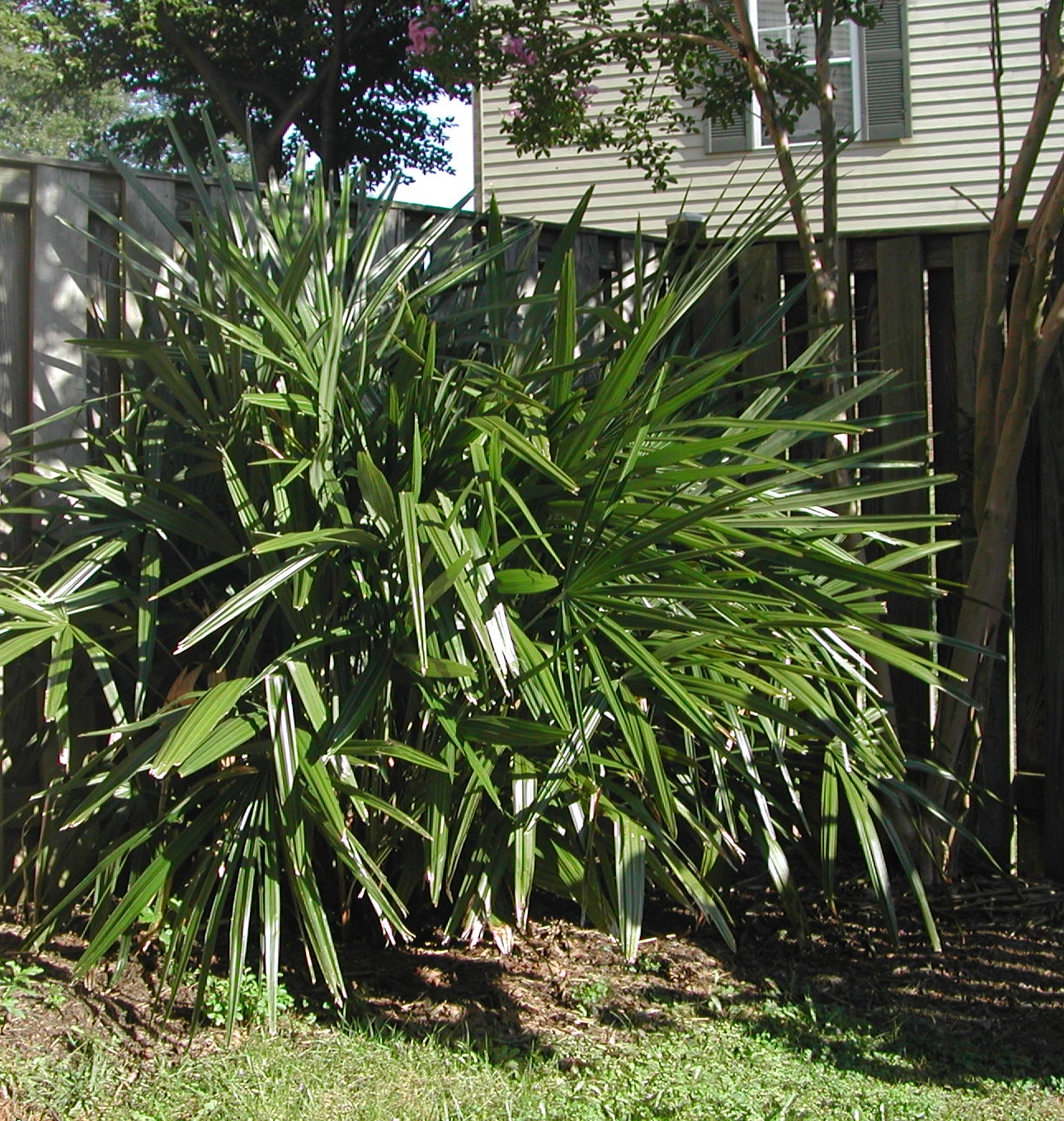
- Specimen planted in a Maryland back yard

Conservation status
- Apparently Secure (NatureServe)

Scientific classification
- Kingdom: Plantae
- Clade: Tracheophytes
- Clade: Angiosperms
- Clade: Monocots
- Clade: Commelinids
- Order: Arecales
- Family: Arecaceae
- Subfamily: Coryphoideae
- Tribe: Trachycarpeae
- Genus: Rhapidophyllum; H.Wendl. & Drude
- Species: R. hystrix

Binomial name
- Rhapidophyllum hystrix (Pursh) H.Wendl. & Drude

Synonyms
- Corypha hystrix Fraser ex Thouin; Chamaerops hystrix (Fraser ex Thouin) Pursh; Sabal hystrix (Fraser ex Thouin) Nutt.; Rhapis caroliniana Kunth

= Rhapidophyllum =

Needle palm

Genus of palms

Rhapidophyllum hystrix, the needle palm, is a palm native to coastal margins of the subtropical eastern Gulf and south Atlantic states of the United States. Populations can be found from coastal southeast South Carolina, southward to Florida and west across the coastal plain of Mississippi and southern Alabama. It is one of the most cold-hardy palms in the world, and can be found growing in several areas with warm temperate climates.

== Description ==
The needle palm assumes a shrublike clumping form with several stems growing from a single base, the stems growing very slowly and tightly together, eventually forming a dense base 1–1.2 m (3.3–3.9 ft) tall, with numerous sharp needle-like spines produced between the leaves; these are 10–25 cm (3.9–9.8 in) long and protect the stem growing point from browsing animals. The whole plant can reach 2–3 m (6.6–9.8 ft) tall to the top of the erect central leaves.

It is a fan palm (Arecaceae, subfamily Coryphoideae), with the leaves with a long petiole terminating in a rounded fan of 8–16 leaflets; each leaf is up to 2 m (6.6 ft) long, with the leaflets up to 60–80 cm (24–31 in) long. The flowers are borne in dense, short clusters at the top of the stems; it is usually dioecious with male and female flowers on separate plants. The fruit is a brown drupe about 2 cm (0.79 in) long.

== Taxonomy ==
It is the sole member of the genus Rhapidophyllum. The scientific name Rhapidophyllum means "needle-leaf", while hystrix is from the scientific name of a genus of porcupines. The English name likewise refers to the needle-like spines produced at the petiole bases; for similar reasons, it is also occasionally called "porcupine palm".

== Cultivation and uses ==
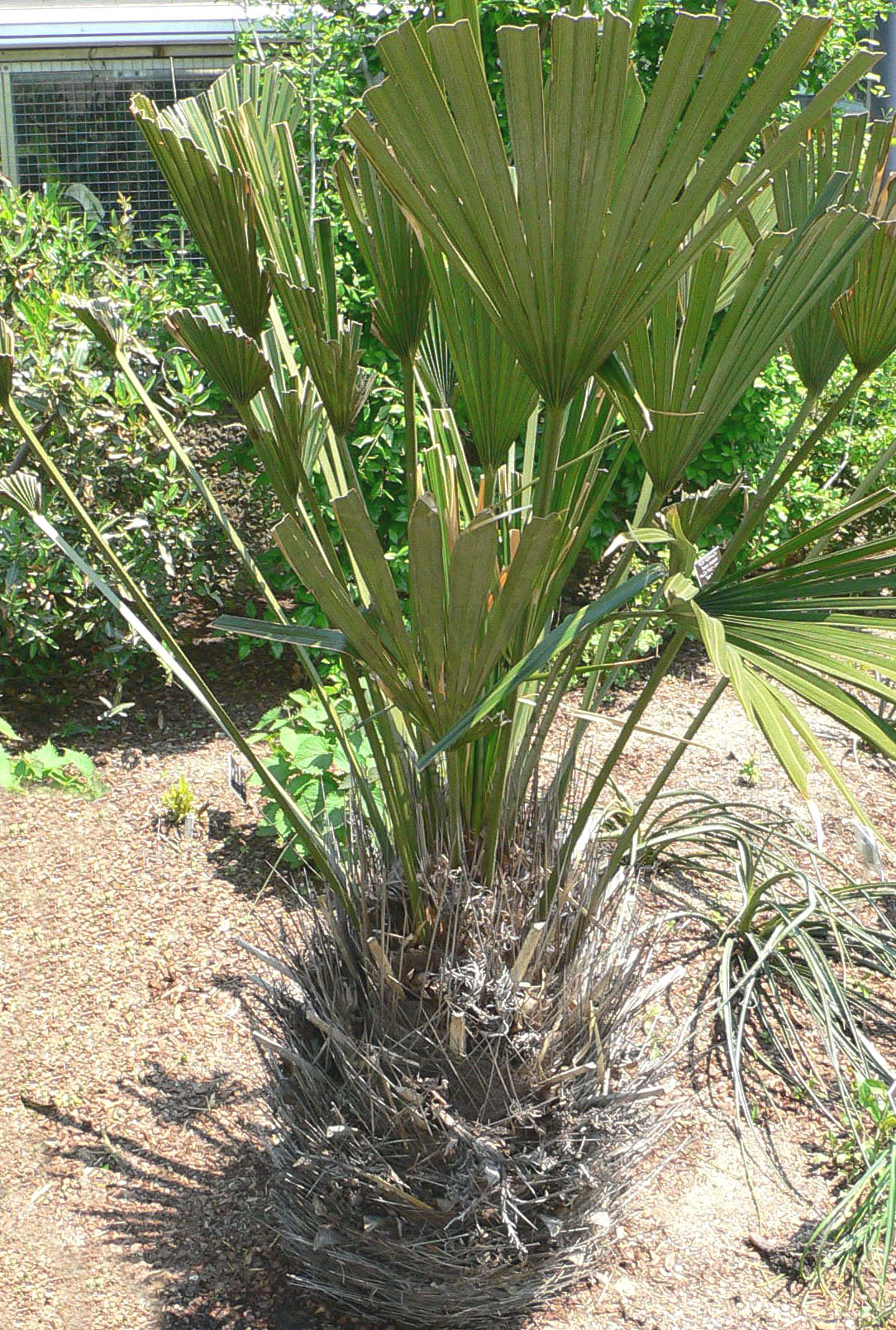
Cultivated plant, with the ends of the leaves cut off and showing the stem needles

The needle palm is very popular among palm enthusiasts in temperate climates for its ability to tolerate modest cold. Some reports have claimed survival of temperatures as low as −26 °C (−15 °F) with heavy damage, but with the palm recovering. More realistic estimates are closer to −21 °C (−5 °F) with foliar damage. Recovery of winter damage of needle palms is much more precarious in climates with cool summers like the Pacific Northwest and northwestern Europe.

In the United States, needle palms are reliably cultivated along the East Coast from Florida to Connecticut, and along the entire West Coast from southern California to Washington. Across the interior of the USA, large well-established specimens have been growing in Tennessee, the southern Ohio Valley, and Washington, DC at the United States National Arboretum since the 1960s. It is the most popular landscaping palms in the Chesapeake Bay area of Maryland. Needle palms need hot summers to thrive and the species does not grow well in the cool summer climates.

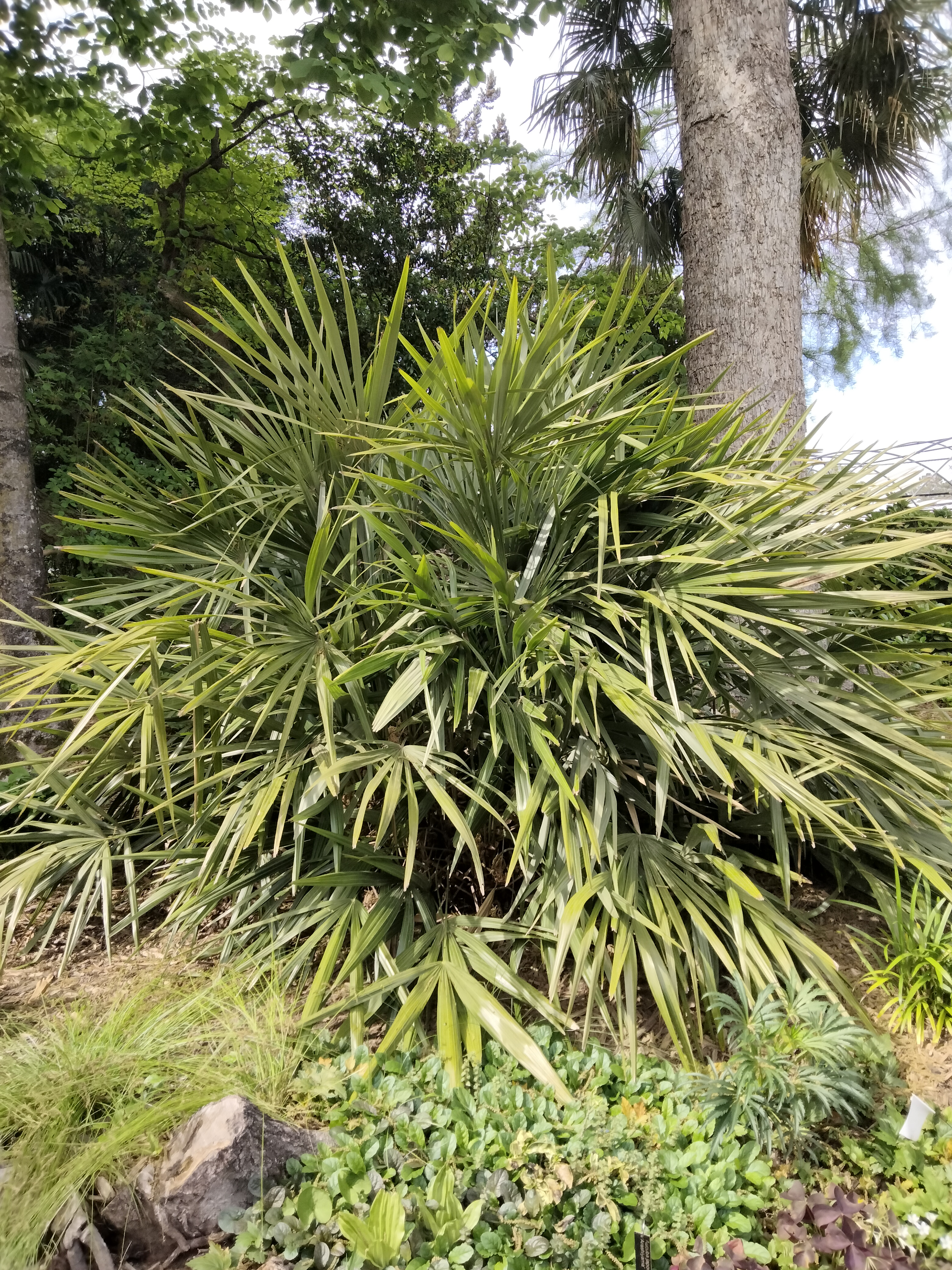
A very mature Rhapidophyllum hystrix growing at Juniper Level Botanic Garden in Garner, NC

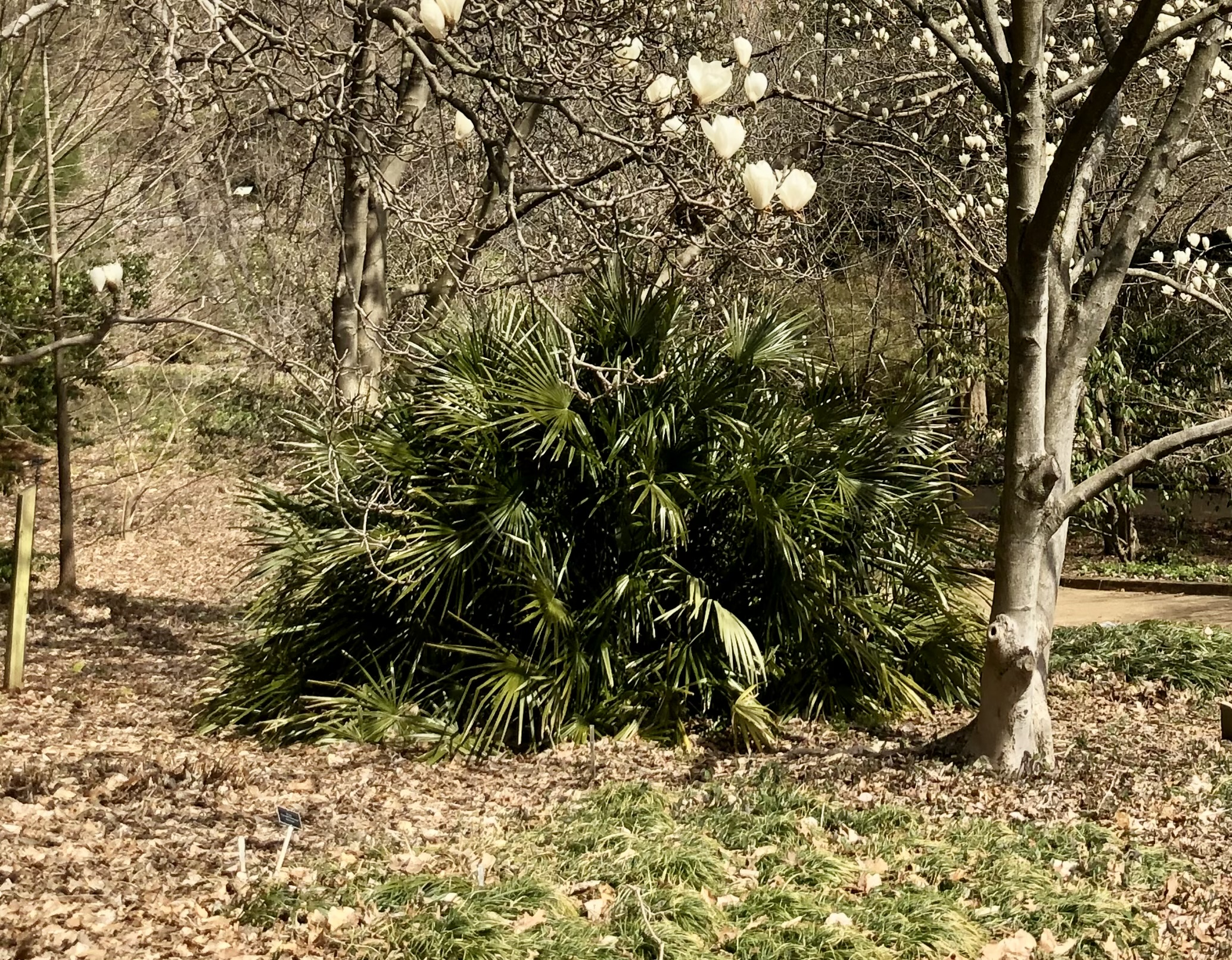
Needle Palm at the U.S. National Arboretum

The needle palm is considered to be commercially exploited and therefore threatened. When purchasing this palm, it is wise to purchase it only from a reputable dealer, as some unscrupulous dealers harvest them directly from the wild.
