= Juniper Level Botanic Gardens =

Botanical garden in Raleigh, North Carolina

Coordinates: 35.6262°N 78.6396°W

Juniper Level Botanic Garden, is a 28+ acre botanical garden & nursery in Raleigh, North Carolina. The garden was established in 1988 by Tony Avent and his late wife Michelle. In 2018, Tony and Anita Avent gifted the privately owned Juniper Level Botanic Gardens to N.C. State University, while retaining lifetime rights. JLBG will become a sister institution to the J.C. Raulston Arboretum.

No synthetic non-organic fertilizers have been used in the garden since 1988, and all runoff (outside of hurricanes) is captured on-site through a series of rain gardens and recirculating runoff collection systems. A large on-site composting program supplies nutrients and compost for the gardens. The botanic garden is open eight weekends per year. It also hosts The Center for Mindfulness and Nonduality, established by Anita Avent in 2013.

== See also ==
- List of botanical gardens in the United States
