= Trichosclereid =

Trichosclereids are hard needlelike branched cells found in some species of plants that serve the purpose of protecting the plant from herbivores. They are usually approximately 6 mm (1/4 inch) long, but in some species they grow to as long as 1 cm (0.4 inches). Trichosclereids are a type of sclereids that can be found in olive leaves and the aerial roots of the Swiss cheese plant (Monstera deliciosa).
