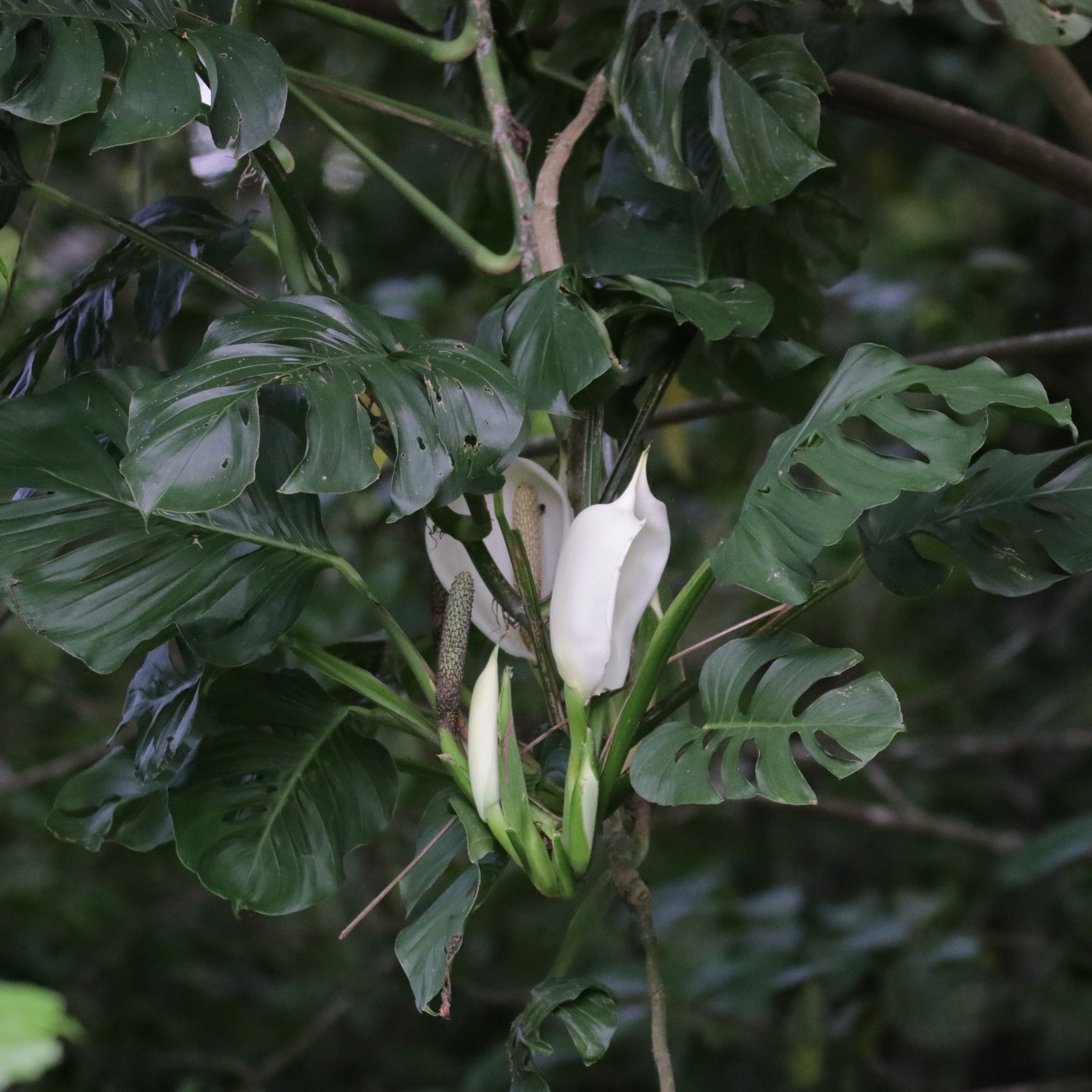

Scientific classification
- Kingdom: Plantae
- Clade: Embryophytes
- Clade: Tracheophytes
- Clade: Spermatophytes
- Clade: Angiosperms
- Clade: Monocots
- Order: Alismatales
- Family: Araceae
- Genus: Monstera
- Species: M. adansonii

Binomial name
- Monstera adansonii Schott

Synonyms
- Monstera pertusa (L.) de Vriese; Dracontium pertusum L.; Calla dracontium G.Mey.; Calla pertusa (L.) Kunth; Philodendron pertusum (L.) K.Koch & C.D.Bouché

= Monstera adansonii =

Species of flowering plant

Monstera adansonii, the Adanson's monstera, Swiss cheese plant, five holes plant or monkey mask plant, is a species of flowering plant from family Araceae, which is widespread across much of South America and Central America. Monstera adansonii is classified as a hemiepiphyte vine and can be found in tropical forests with hot and high humidity conditions.

The common name "Swiss cheese plant" is also used for the also very often cultivated species Monstera deliciosa.

== Description ==
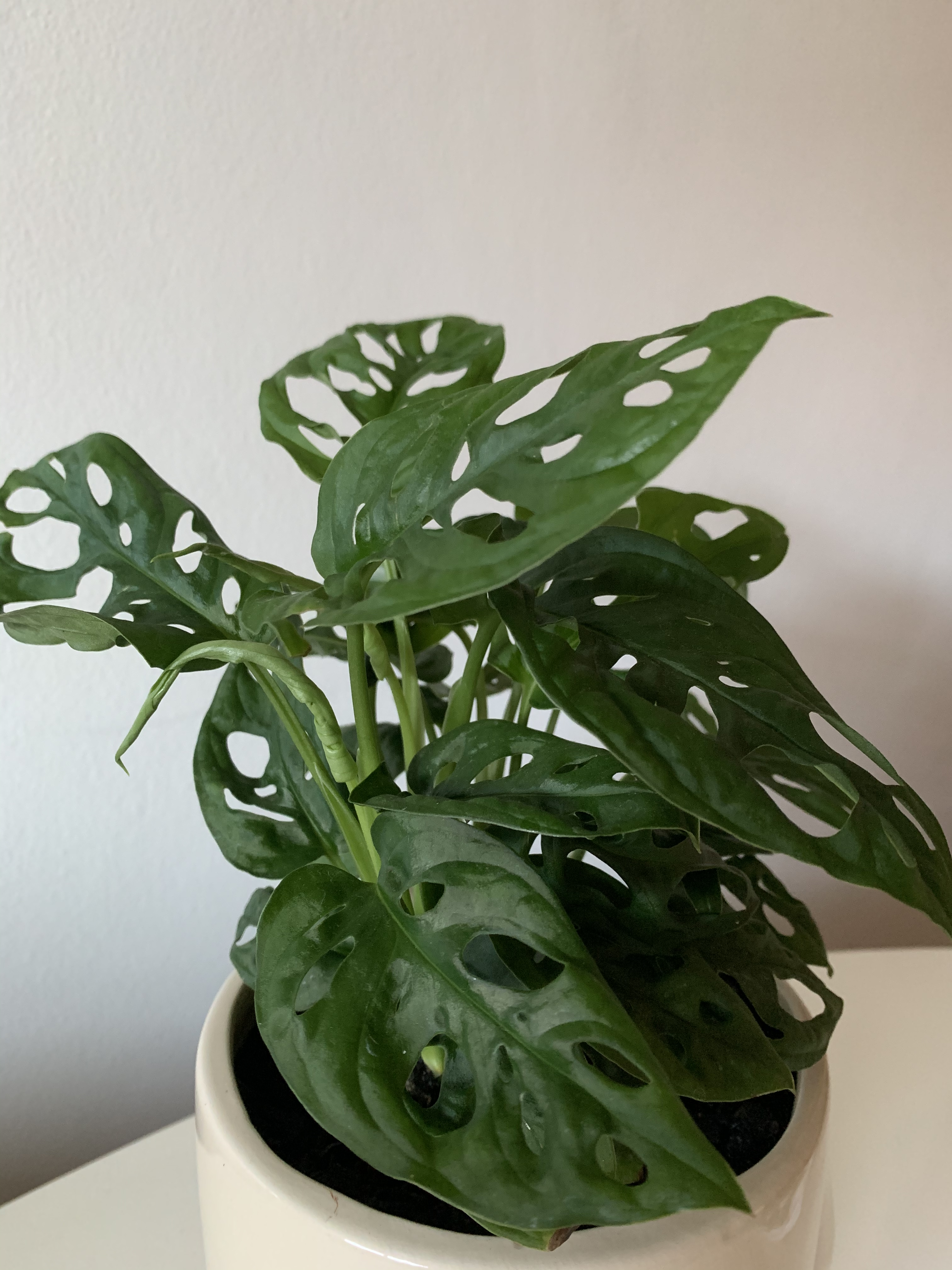
In pot

Monstera adansonii is known for its heart-shaped leaves. The leaves have a somewhat thick, waxy texture, and contain large, oval-shaped perforations, which led to its common name of "Swiss cheese plant". It grows to be 3–5 feet (0.9–2 m) tall as a houseplant, and up to 13 feet (4.0 m) as a vine. The Adanson's monstera is an easy to care for houseplant that likes bright, indirect sunlight, and well draining soil. There are some cultivars with variegated leaves, including 'Archipelago'.

Currently, there are four recognized subspecies: Monstera adansonii subsp. adansonii, M. adansonii subsp. blanchetii, M. adansonii subsp. klotzschiana and M. adansonii subsp. laniata.

== Distribution ==
Other regions this plant may be found in are the West Indies, Antigua, Grenada, Saba, St. Kitts, Guadeloupe, Marie Galante, Dominica, Martinique, St. Lucia, St. Vincent, Tobago, and Trinidad. The species are quite common near river valleys at lower elevations.
