= Daniel J. Hinkley =

American plantsman

Daniel John Hinkley is an American plantsman, garden writer, horticulturist and nurseryman. He is best known for establishing Heronswood Nursery, in Kingston, Washington; and Windcliff, on the Kitsap Peninsula near Indianola, WA; and for collecting, propagating, and naming varieties of plants new to the North American nursery trade.

== Biography ==
Having had an interest in botany and gardening from childhood, Dan Hinkley earned his Bachelor of Science in Ornamental Horticulture, and Horticulture Education, from Michigan State University in 1976. He went on to graduate school at the University of Washington, where he accomplished a Master of Science degree in Urban Horticulture in 1985.

Hinkley was an instructor of horticulture at Edmonds Community College, in Edmonds, Washington, from 1987 to 1996.

In 1987 Hinkley began gardening on the land that would become Heronswood with his partner, the architect Robert L. Jones. By the mid-1990s Heronswood Nursery was doing a thriving mail-order business, and the display garden tours gained international acclaim. Hinkley became a regular speaker at seminars offered during the Northwest Flower and Garden Show.

In 2000, Hinkley and Jones sold the business, and display gardens, to Burpee Seeds, but continued to run the nursery. Hinkley and Jones moved to a residence separate from the nursery in Indianola, Washington.

By 2001 the Heronswood catalog included over 2,400 plants, and the gardens at Heronswood had 10,000 species. Many had been raised from seed collected by Hinkley during expeditions in Asia, and other remote exploratory travels. Within the Heronswood catalog, Hinkley would often write detailed essays about the people and places where he first encountered the plants, his adventures abroad, and also the desirable benefits the plants offered to the plant enthusiast. Considerable effort was given to the responsible collection of seeds, and also to evaluating prospective plants for risk of bio-invasion if offered into cultivation.

In May 2006, George Ball, President of Burpee and Company, closed the Kingston location.

In 2012 the Port Gamble S'Klallam Tribe bought the long neglected and overgrown Heronswood at auction and brought Hinkley back as a consultant to oversee its restoration, eventually appointing him Director of the garden that he had founded. Many plants were lost over the years of neglect, but many important collections were recovered, and many new plants collected during Hinkley's explorations of China, Vietnam, Chile, Myanmar, New Zealand and Tasmania have been given new homes in the garden.

Mr. Hinkley also continues his work at his estate, Windcliff, on a bluff above Puget Sound on the Kitsap Peninsula.

== Published works ==
=== Books ===
- Winter Ornamentals, 1993, Sasquatch Press.
- The Explorer's Garden: Rare and Unusual Perennials, 1999, Timber Press.
- The Explorer's Garden: Shrubs and Vines from the Four Corners of the World, 2009, Timber Press.
- Windcliff: A Story of People, Plants, and Gardens (with photography by Claire Takacs), to be published in 2020 by Timber Press.

=== Periodical articles ===
- Heronswood Nursery annual catalog, 25 to 250 pages, 1991–2005
- Open Spaces, Adventures in the Plant Trade, volume 4, issue 4, 2002
- Also articles in: American Gardener, Garden Design, Horticulture Magazine, Martha Stewart Living, Pacific Horticulture, Seattle Times Pacific Magazine, Gardens Illustrated, Northwest Garden News, Garden Showcase

== Awards and honors ==
- Veitch Memorial Medal (V.M.M.), Royal Horticultural Society of Great Britain, 2007, "for outstanding contribution to advancing the science and practice of horticulture".
- George Robert White Medal of Honor, Massachusetts Horticultural Society, 2007, "for one who has done the most to advance interest in horticulture in the broadest sense".
- Liberty Hyde Bailey Award, American Horticultural Society, 2006
- Medal of Honor, Garden Club of America, 2004
- Marcel Le Piniac Award, North American Rock Garden Society, 2004
- Scott Arboretum Gold Medal, lifetime achievement award, Swarthmore College, 2002
- Garden Communicator of the Year, American Nursery and Landscape Association, 2001
- White Gold Medal, Cleveland Horticultural Society, 2000
- American Horticulture Society Book of the Year Award for The ExplorersGarden, 1999
