= Tony Avent =

American horticulturist and plantsman

- Born: Raleigh, NC, USA
- Occupations: Horticulturalist, Author, Businessman
- Website: www.plantdelights.com

Tony Avent is an American horticulturist, author, and public speaker. He and his wife Anita Avent own Plant Delights Nursery and Juniper Level Botanic Garden in Raleigh, North Carolina.

== Early life and education ==
Tony Avent attended North Carolina State University and graduated in 1978 with a Bachelor of Science degree in Horticultural Science. He studied under the horticulturist J. C. Raulston. Avent was inspired by Raulston who built the JC Raulston Arboretum. In 1977, he married Michelle Morgan Avent (1957–2012).

== Career ==
In 1978, he began working for the North Carolina State Fairgrounds in Raleigh as its Landscape Director. He worked there for 16 years until 1994. In addition he worked as a volunteer curator of the Shade Garden at the J. C. Raulston Arboretum from 1985 to 1994. He also worked as a weekly garden columnist for Raleigh's News and Observer newspaper from 1987 to 1998. He established Plant Delights Nursery and Juniper Level Botanic Gardens in 1988.

In 2018, Avent was named a Distinguished Alumni at his alma mater, North Carolina State University, and in 2025, he was awarded the Veitch Memorial Medal by the Royal Horticultural Society.

== Writing ==
- So You Want to Start a Nursery – Timber Press (July 2003)
