= Heronswood (botanical garden) =

Botanical garden in Kingston, Washington, United States

Coordinates: 47°49′15″N 122°32′56″W

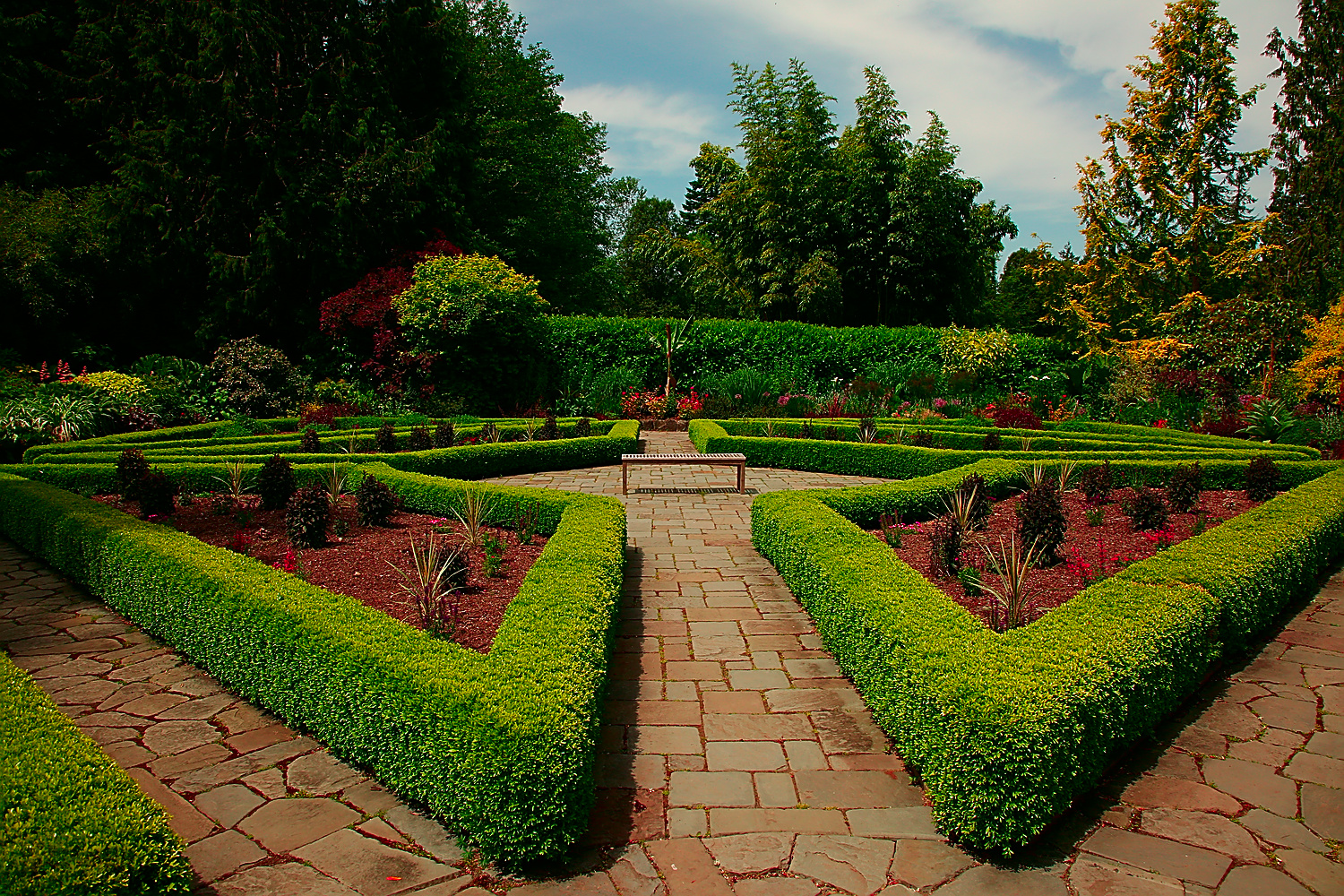
- One area of the gardens.
- Interactive map of Heronswood
- Type: Botanical garden
- Location: Kingston, Washington
- Founder: Dan Hinkley and Robert Jones
- Owner: Port Gamble S’Klallam Tribe
- Website: www.heronswoodgarden.org

Heronswood is a botanical garden located in Kingston, Washington, in the Northwestern United States. It is also the name for a now defunct mail order specialty plant nursery business that originated at the gardens.

== History ==
Heronswood (gardens and nursery) was established by Dan Hinkley and Robert Jones in 1987, on a 10 acres (40,000 m^{2}) site, later expanded to 15 acres. The display gardens exhibit plant varieties that were collected from around the world, then tested and propagated for introduction into the North American nursery trade. The display gardens have been featured internationally as an example of creative, environmentally sensitive, and botanically impressive plantsmanship and garden design. Heronswood maintains significant collections of plants from the hydrangea (Hydrangeaceae), barberry (Berberidaceae), aralia (Araliaceae) and buttercup (Ranunculaceae) families, together with considerable collections of conifers, hardy ferns, woodland lilies (e.g. Polygonatum, Disporum, Cardiocrinum, Lilium, Trillium, Paris) and hardy begonias. It is an affiliate garden of the Hardy Fern Foundation.

=== Burpee Company ===
The botanical garden real estate and nursery business associated with it were bought by the W. Atlee Burpee Company in 2000. The gardens were added to more than 150 acres (0.61 km^{2}) of land scattered throughout various locations in the Mid-Atlantic U.S. and England. Plant research and production then encompassed four USDA hardiness zones, including zones 5–9. The display garden was opened to the public on periodic Open House occasions.

In 2006, the business conducted under the Heronswood brand was closed by W. Atlee Burpee. The company CEO cited a lack of demand for rare plants as a major factor in the failure of the business. The closure coincided with difficult financial circumstances for Burpee's following a rapid expansion prior to the purchase.

=== Port Gamble S'Klallam Tribe ===
The Heronswood botanical garden and Heronswood Nursery Company was sold to the Port Gamble S’Klallam Tribe (PGST) in the summer of 2012. The tribal council has stated it is committed to maintaining the garden as an asset to the community. S’Klallam tribe chairman Jeromy Sullivan said, “We understand how passionate people are about Heronswood and, as a neighbor, we are committed to maintaining this local treasure.” "Currently, Heronswood Garden is under very positive restoration efforts which are being led by various members of the Heronswood Staff, the Port Gamble S'Klallam Tribe, the Heronswood Garden steering committee, and dozens of very skilled and dedicated volunteers.

== Heronswood Nursery ==
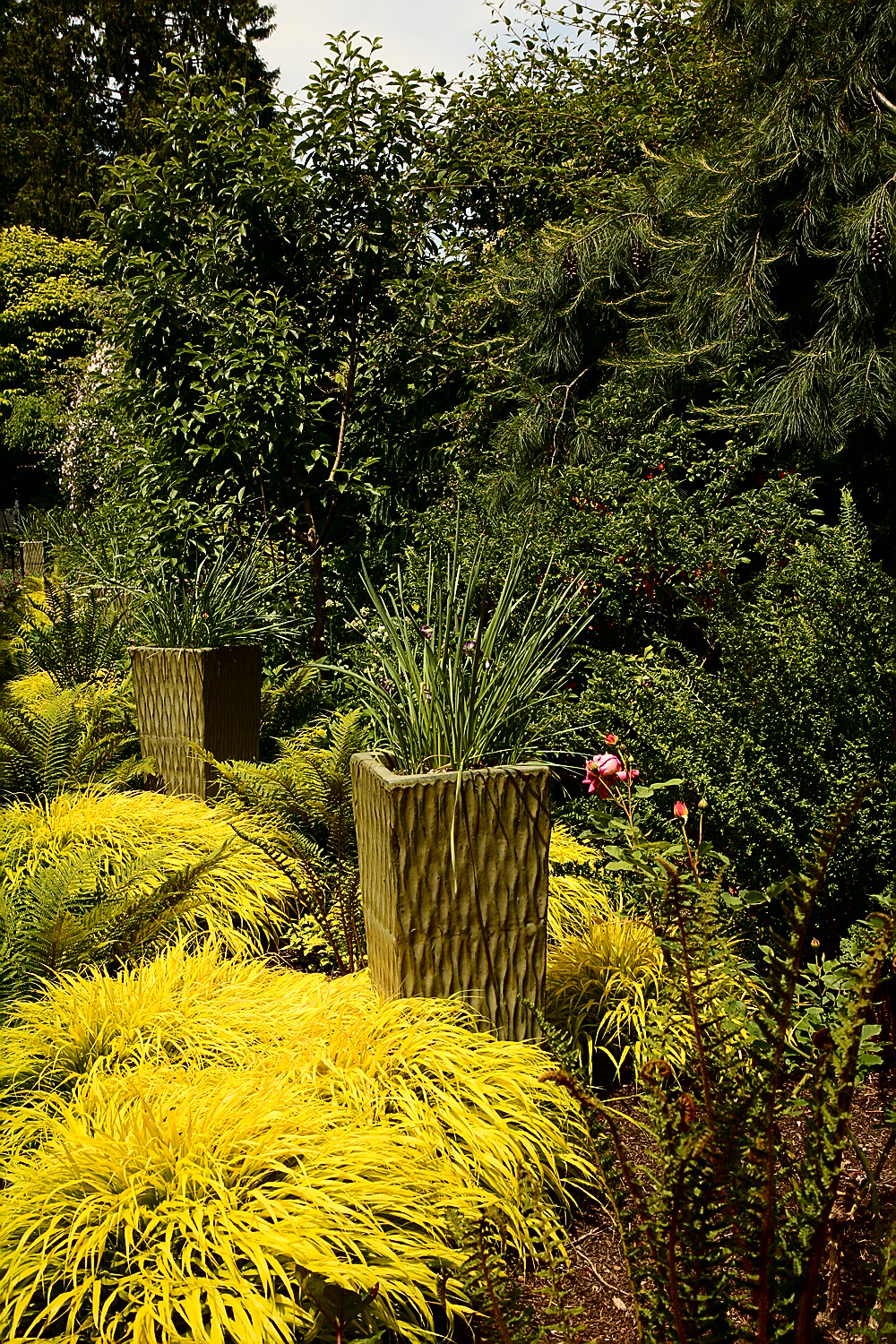
Plants from around the world were a core part of the nursery.

Heronswood was also a catalog resource for rare and unusual plants, originally established by Dan Hinkley and Robert Jones in 1987, and primarily offering plants collected by Dan on his travels.

Heronswood as a nursery brand became a wholly owned subsidiary of the Burpee Seed Company in 2000. After the 2012 sale of the Heronswood Nursery Company, Burpee retained rights to sell Heronswood cultivars. The primary Burpee display and trial gardens are presently located on the Fordhook Farm in Doylestown, Pennsylvania. Fordhook Farm is the original home and gardens of seed pioneer Washington Atlee Burpee.

The "Heronswood Nursery Company" is being considered in the Port Gamble S’Klallam Tribe's plans as potential part of tribal economic development and employment, and vocational education opportunities. As of 2023, there are no plans to re-establish the mail order nursery and the only plants produced on site are for local distribution. Heronswood sells plants produced at the Windcliff Nursery owned by Dan and Robert.
