= Plant Delights Nursery =

Mail order plant nursery based in Raleigh, North Carolina

Coordinates: 35.6262°N 78.6396°W

Plant Delights
- Company type: Privately held company
- Industry: Mail order nursery
- Founded: 1988
- Headquarters: Raleigh, North Carolina, U.S.
- Products: Rare and unusual perennials
- Owner: Tony Avent and Anita Avent
- Website: www.plantdelights.com

Plant Delights Nursery is a mail order plant nursery based in Raleigh, North Carolina, specializing in herbaceous perennials, and owned by Tony Avent and partner Anita Avent. The nursery was established in 1988.

Plant Delights Nursery has a specialty catalog with humorous, topical covers drawn by cartoonist Jack Pittman. The nursery has been featured in many newspapers, magazines, and on television.

In 2012, the nursery's spring catalog cover ignited a strong reprisal from Penn State alumni when the cover featured a caricature of former coach Jerry Sandusky dressed as a lion with a Penn State logo attached chasing children down a road. Numerous Facebook comments directed to the business were deleted. Avent commented on News 5 WRAL in Raleigh that he stands by his artwork.

In 2021, Plant Delights' spring catalog featured President Joe Biden, Vice President Kamala Harris, and a number of children reading sexually suggestive pages from a book held by Biden entitled "Kama Seedtra".
