= Jack Pittman =

American cartoonist and illustrator

Jack Pittman is a freelance American cartoonist and illustrator whose work has appeared in advertisements for American Express, Coca-Cola, General Motors, and other prominent campaigns. He received the National Cartoonist Society Advertising and Illustration Award for 1995 and 1998, with an additional nomination for 1997, and was nominated for their Magazine Illustration Award for 2001. In 2005, he received a Reuben Award in the category of Magazine Illustration.
