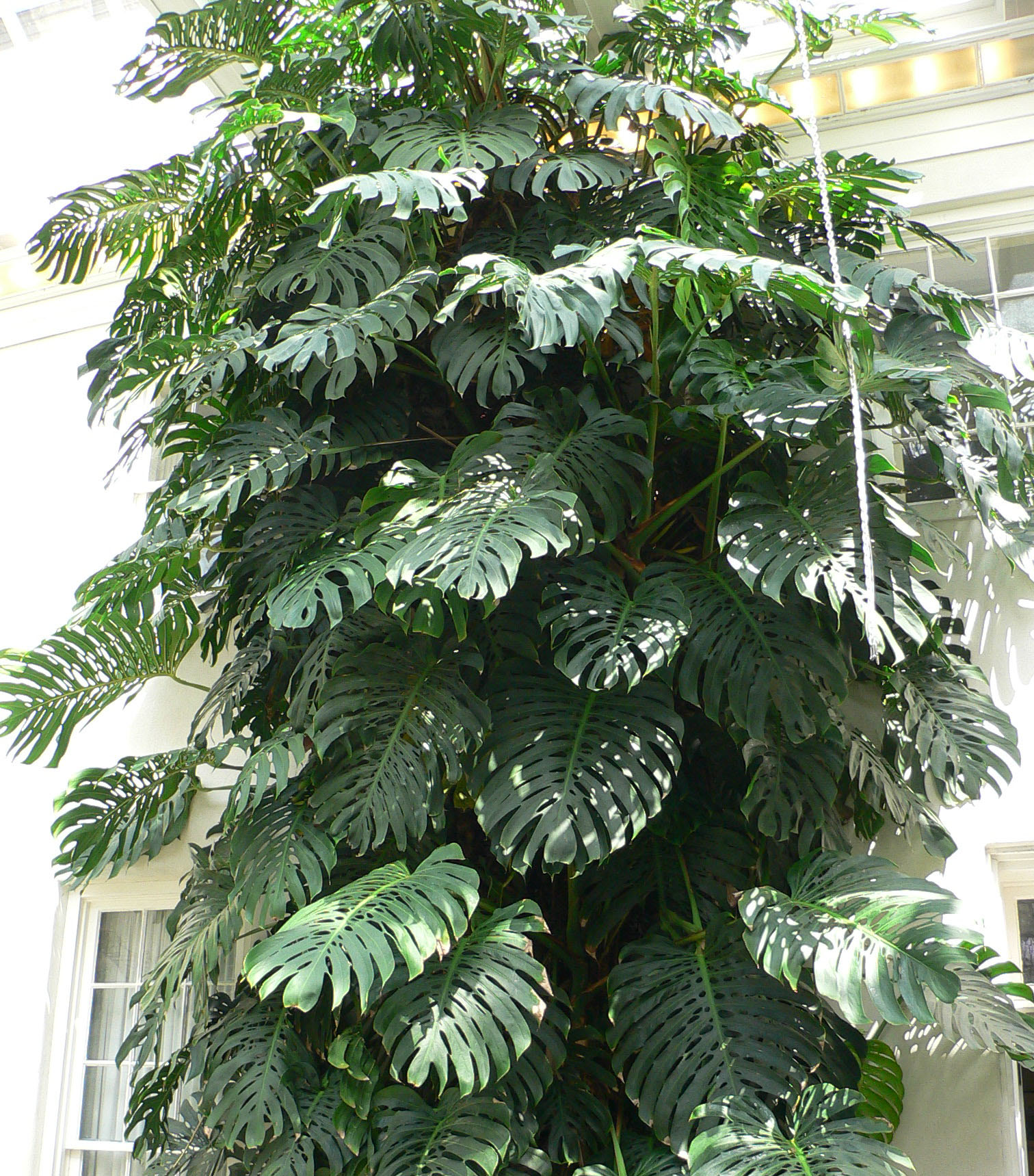
- Specimen at Longwood Gardens, Pennsylvania
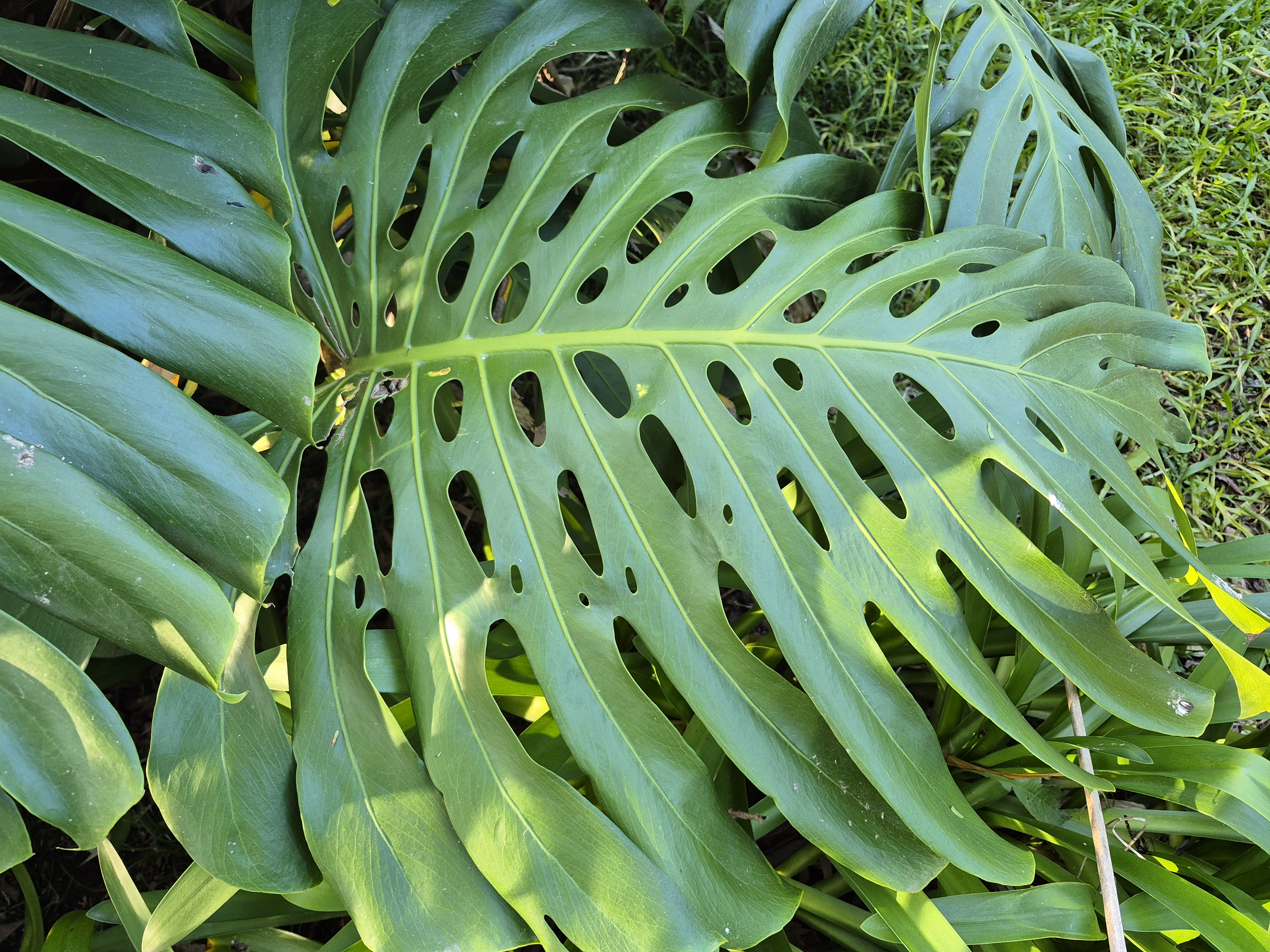
- Leaf in Brazil

Scientific classification
- Kingdom: Plantae
- Clade: Tracheophytes
- Clade: Angiosperms
- Clade: Monocots
- Order: Alismatales
- Family: Araceae
- Genus: Monstera
- Species: M. deliciosa

Binomial name
- Monstera deliciosa Liebm.

Synonyms
- List: Monstera borsigiana K.Koch; Monstera deliciosa var. borsigiana Engl.; Monstera deliciosa var. sierrana G.S.Bunting; Philodendron anatomicum Kunth & C.D.Bouché; Philodendron pertusum Kunth & C.D.Bouché; Tornelia fragrans Gutierrez ex Schott

= Monstera deliciosa =

Species of plant

Monstera deliciosa, the Swiss cheese plant or split-leaf philodendron, is a species of flowering plant. The common name "Swiss cheese plant" is also used for the related species from the same genus, Monstera adansonii. The common name "split-leaf philodendron" is also used for the species Philodendron bipinnatifidum.

Monstera deliciosa is native to tropical forests of southern Mexico, south to Panama. It has been introduced to many tropical areas, and considered a low-to-moderate invasion risk in Hawaii, Seychelles, Ascension Island and the Society Islands. It is very widely grown in temperate zones as a houseplant. Although the plant contains insoluble calcium oxalate crystals, which cause a needlelike sensation when touched, the ripe fruit is edible.

== Names ==
The specific epithet deliciosa means "delicious", referring to the edible fruit. The genus Monstera is named from the Latin word for "monstrous" or "abnormal", and refers to the unusual leaves with natural holes that members of the genus have.

Its popular name as a houseplant of "Swiss cheese plant", or just "cheese plant", is commonly stated to refer to the "eyes" or holes that develop in its leaves similar to the holes in some Swiss-type cheeses such as Emmental cheese.

Other common names include delicious monster, fruit salad plant, fruit salad tree (in reference to its edible fruit, which tastes similar to a fruit salad), ceriman (Trinidad), ojal (Venezuela), hojadillo (Colombia), monster fruit, monsterio delicio, monstereo, Mexican breadfruit, windowleaf, balazo and Penglai banana. The names in Spanish (costilla de Adán), Portuguese (costela-de-adão), and French (plante gruyère) refer to the change of the leaves from entire to fenestrated, comparing it in the first two cases with the ribs of Adam and in the third with the hole-filled gruyère cheese. In Mexico, the plant is sometimes referred to as piñanona. In coastal regions of Sicily, especially Palermo, it is called zampa di leone (lion's paw).

== Description ==
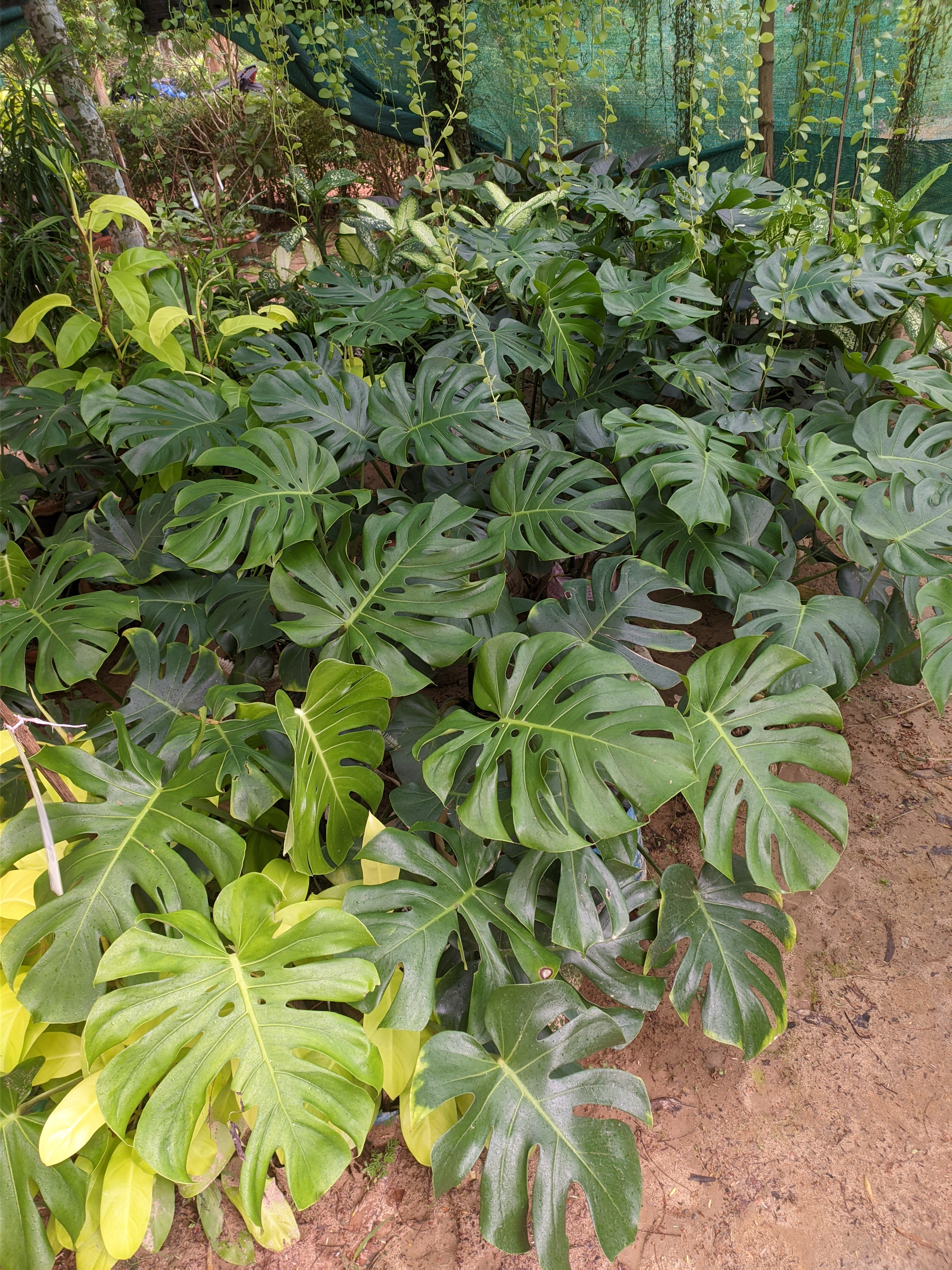
At Cox's Bazar, Bangladesh

This member of the arum family (Araceae) is a hemiepiphyte with aerial roots. It is able to grow up to 20 m (66 ft) high in the wild, with large, leathery, glossy, pinnate, heart-shaped leaves 25–90 cm (10–35.5 in) long by 25–75 cm (10–29.5 in) broad. The leaves on young plants are smaller and entire with no lobes or holes, but soon produce lobed and fenestrate leaves as they grow. Although it can grow very tall in nature, it only measures between 2 and 3 m (6.6 and 9.8 ft) when grown indoors. The older the plant, the more the leaves are covered with its familiar large perforations. The exact purpose of the fenestrations remains unclear, but three main theories have been brought forth: increasing water absorption, limiting the damage done by the wind and reducing the impact of herbivores.

Wild seedlings grow towards the darkest area they can grow until they find a tree trunk, then start to grow up towards the light, creeping up the tree.

The inflorescence is adorned with a cream-white spathe of uniform, velvety appearance, covering, like a hood, a yellowish white spadix 10 to 15 cm (3.9 to 5.9 in) high and about 3 cm (1.2 in) in diameter. Flowers are bisexual, containing both androecium and gynoecium, though protogynous development reduces self-pollination; in the wild they are pollinated mainly by nitidulid beetles.

=== Fruit ===
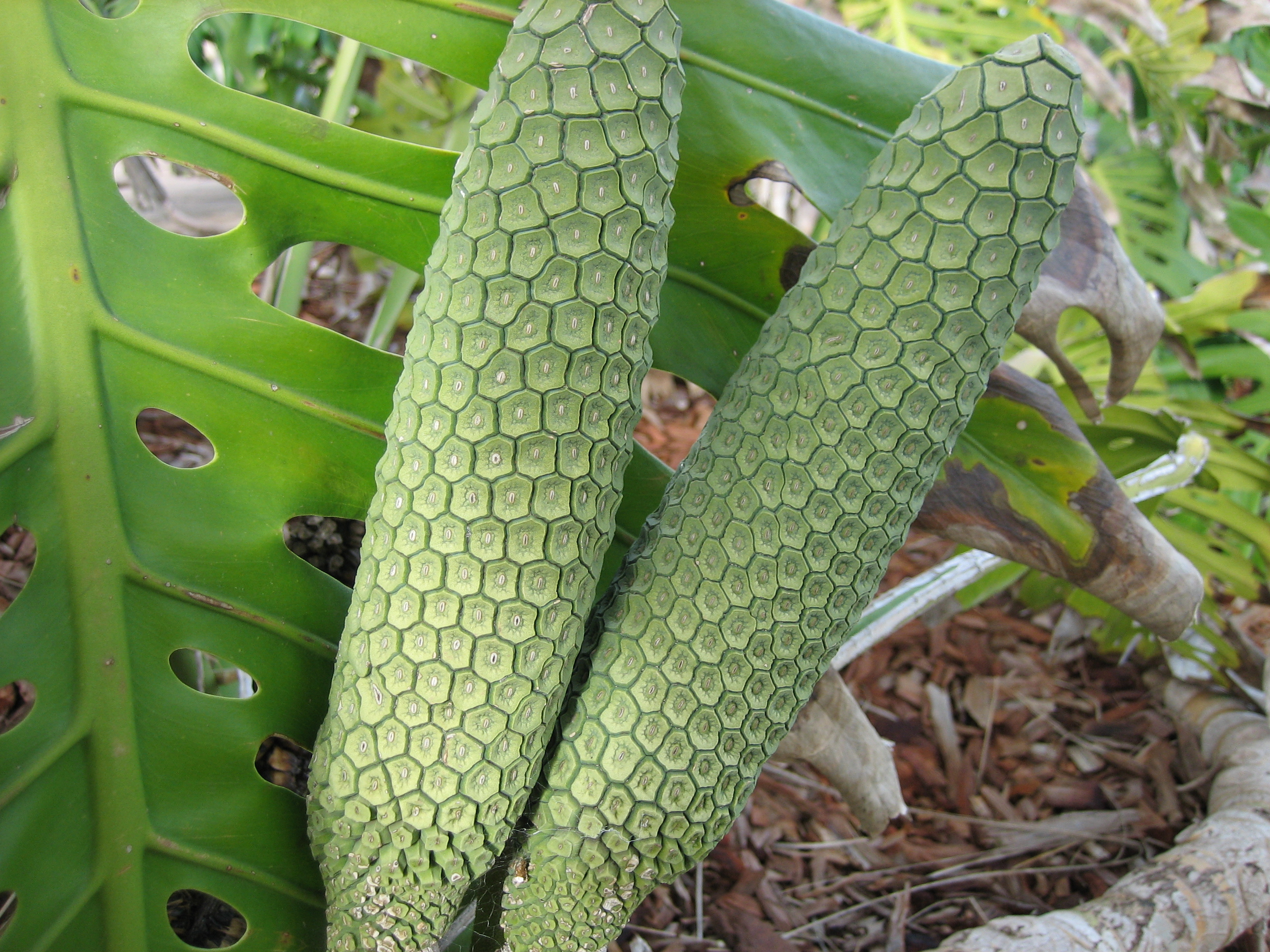
Fruit growing

The fruit of Monstera deliciosa is up to 25 cm (10 in) long and 3–5 cm (1.2–2.0 in) diameter, and it looks like a green ear of maize covered with hexagonal scales. As the fruit ripens, these scales or platelets fall off the fruit, releasing a strong and sweet scent. The smell has been compared to a combination of pineapples and bananas. The fruit is edible and safe for humans.

Fruits of plants of the Araceae (Arum family) often contain raphides and trichosclereids – needle-like structures of calcium oxalate. In M. deliciosa, unripe fruit containing these needle-like crystalline structures can cause irritation of the mouth.

It takes longer than a year for fruits to reach maturity. The fruit first shows signs of ripening by the yellowing of its lowest scales. As it ripens, the starch that was stored in the green fruit is converted to sugar, giving it its sweet flavor. This mechanism is comparable to how banana fruits ripen. The strong odor the fruit produces becomes noticeable when it is half-ripe. As time passes and the fruit continues to ripen, the odor becomes stronger. After it becomes fully ripe, however, the scent deteriorates quickly.

== Distribution and growth ==
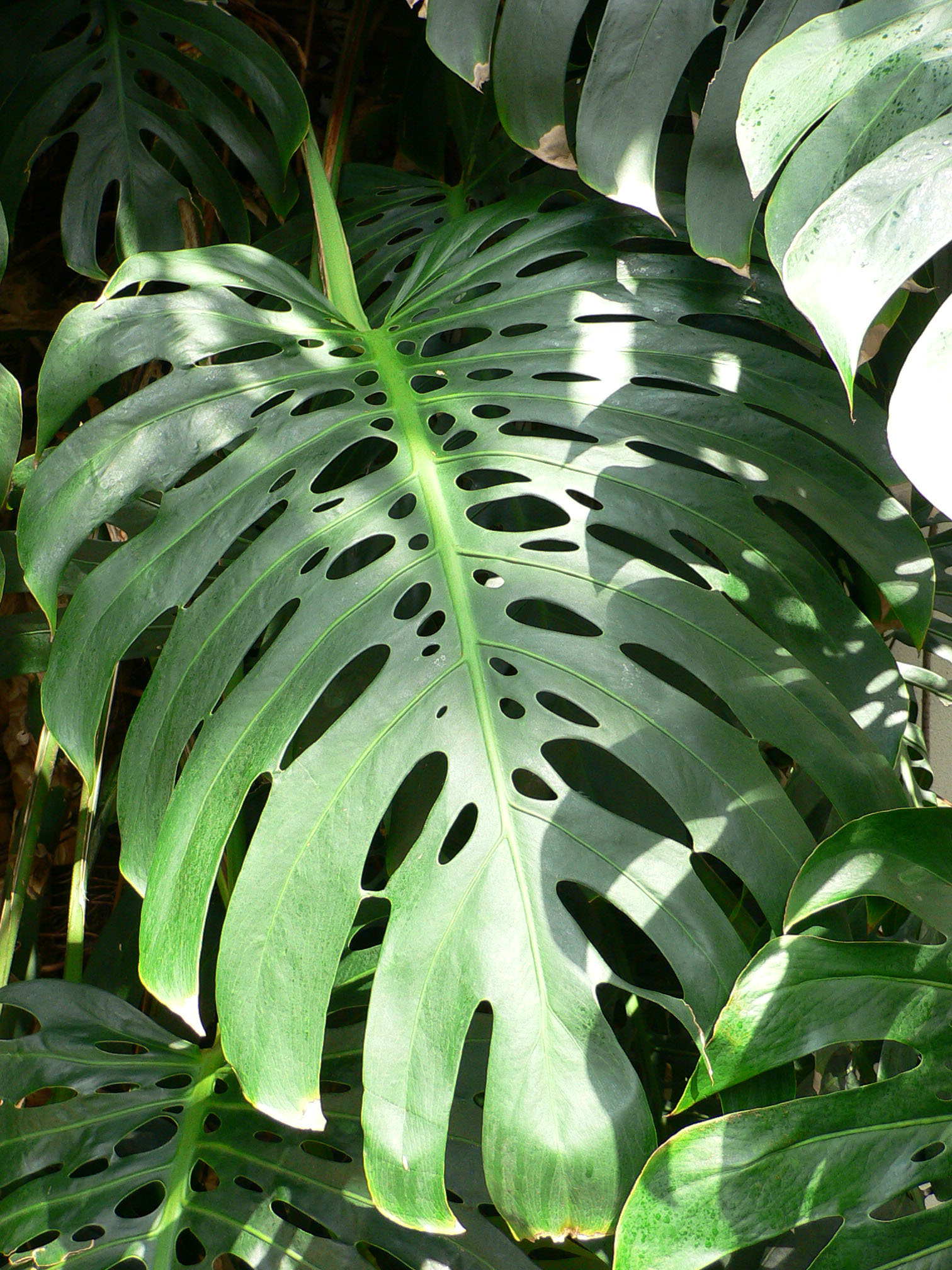
Leaf

Monstera deliciosa is native to humid tropical forests, in lowlands and on lower mountains, in the south of Mexico and also in Costa Rica, Guatemala and Panama. The seeds fall to the ground, then the seedlings crawl (negative phototropism) until they meet a tree on which to attach. The many adjacent roots thus allow the plant to anchor against its new support and reach the canopy light (although it rarely grows in full sun and prefers a light dimmed by the foliage). Introduced plants can also be found in other parts of North America (Florida), Asia (Malaysia and India), Australia and the Western Mediterranean and Atlantic (Sicily, Mainland Portugal, Morocco, Madeira), also in Madagascar.

== Cultivation ==
Monstera deliciosa is commonly grown outdoors as an ornamental plant in the tropics and subtropics. The plant requires a lot of space and a rich and loose soil (ideally garden soil and compost in equal parts). If it grows in the ground it is better to plant it near a tree, where it can climb, if not against a trellis. It is a "moderately greedy plant", in that it needs to be watered just to keep the soil slightly moist. Its hardiness is 11 (that is to say the coldest at −1 °C or 30 °F). It cannot withstand these temperatures for more than a few hours, but it can live outside in certain temperate regions (Mediterranean coast, Brittany). A steady minimum temperature of at least 13–15 °C (55–59 °F) is preferable, allowing continuous growth. Growth ceases below 10 °C (50 °F) and it is killed by frost. It needs very bright exposure, but not full sun.

Forcing a M. deliciosa to flower outside of its typical tropical habitat proves to be difficult. Specific conditions need to be met for the plant to flower. However, in its tropical and subtropical habitat, the plant flowers easily. In ideal conditions it flowers about three years after planting. The plant can be propagated by taking cuttings of a mature plant or by air layering.

=== Indoor cultivation ===
Its architectural qualities, ease of cultivation, and tolerance of a wide range of conditions make it widely cultivated indoors. For this reason it is a popular plant for the home or office throughout the temperate northern hemisphere. It prefers bright indirect light and temperatures of 20–30 °C (68–86 °F). It is usually watered when the soil has slightly dried out (after around one or two weeks). It requires a well-draining, peat-based soil to thrive, such as a soil made with perlite and pieces of bark. Flowering is rare when grown indoors.

In the UK Monstera deliciosa and the cultivar 'Variegata' have gained the Royal Horticultural Society's Award of Garden Merit.

== Toxicity ==
Monstera deliciosa is moderately toxic to both cats and dogs because it contains needle-like insoluble calcium oxalate crystals. These crystals may cause injury to the mouth, tongue, and digestive tract. It also causes dermatitis by direct contact with cat and dog skin.

== Uses ==
In those areas where it grows naturally, M. deliciosa is considered a delicacy due to its sweet and exotic flavor. The fruit may be ripened by cutting it when the first scales begin to lift up and it begins to exude a pungent odor. It is wrapped in a paper bag and set aside until the scales begin popping off. The scales are then brushed off or fall away to reveal the edible flesh underneath. The flesh, which is similar to pineapple in texture, can be cut away from the core and eaten. It has a fruity taste similar to jackfruit and pineapple. The unripe green fruits can irritate the throat and the latex of the leaves and vines can create rashes in the skin, because both contain calcium oxalate: that is the reason why the fruits have to be consumed when the scales lift up. The black irritant fibers can be swept off with the application of a little citrus juice.

The aerial roots have been used as ropes in Peru, and to make baskets in Mexico. In Martinique, the root is used to make a traditional medicine for snakebites. In Mexico, it is used as traditional medicine for the relief of arthritis symptoms.

== Gallery ==
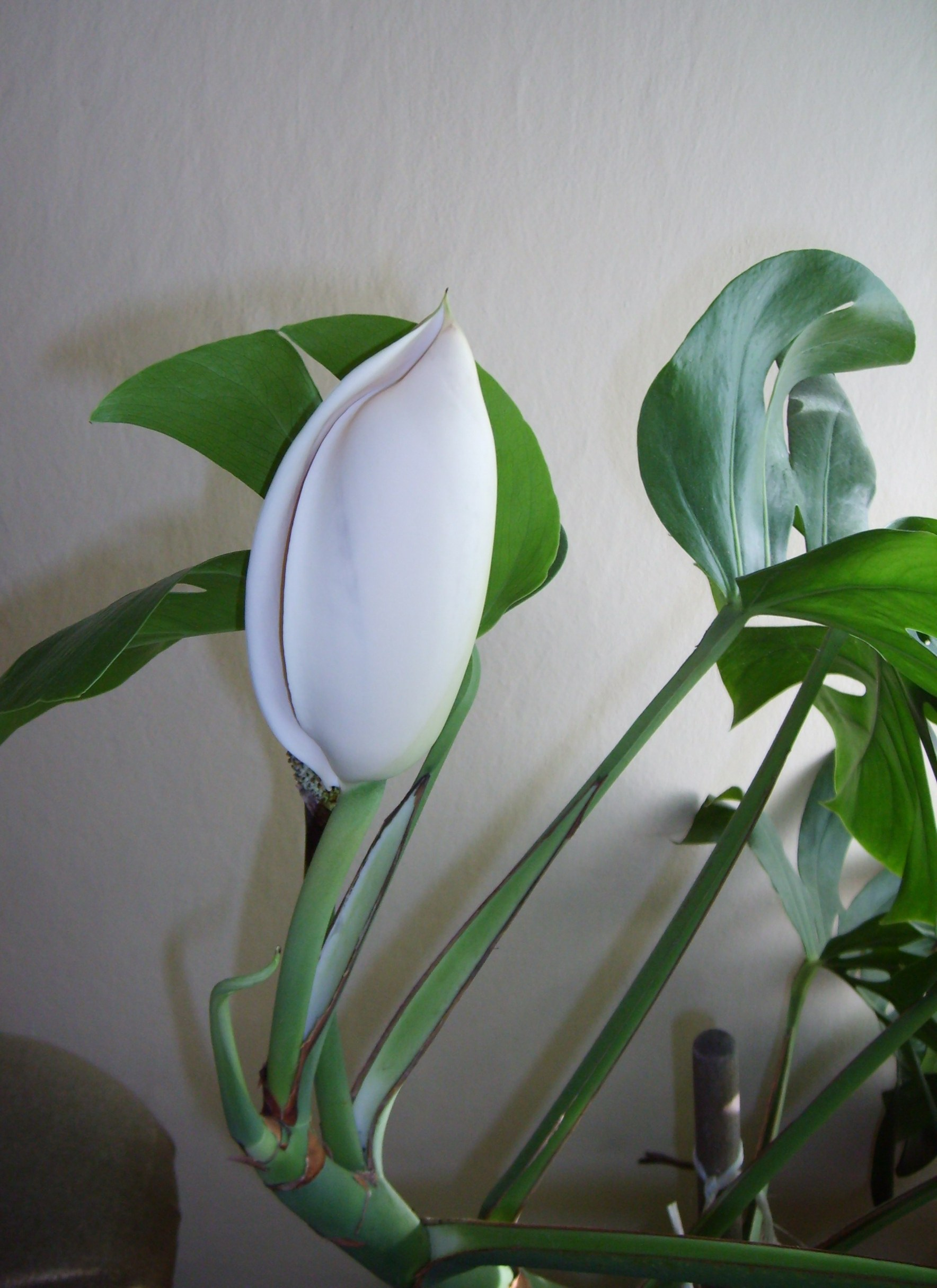
Inflorescence

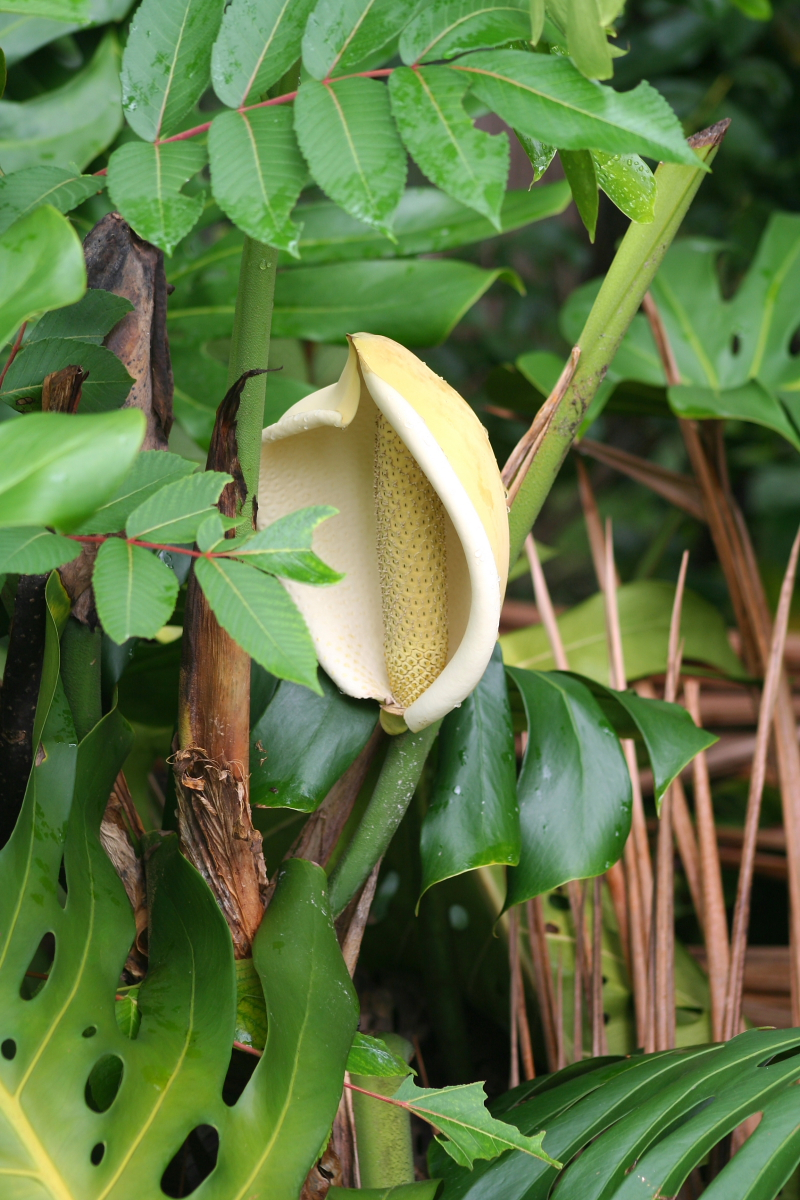
Leaf and inflorescence

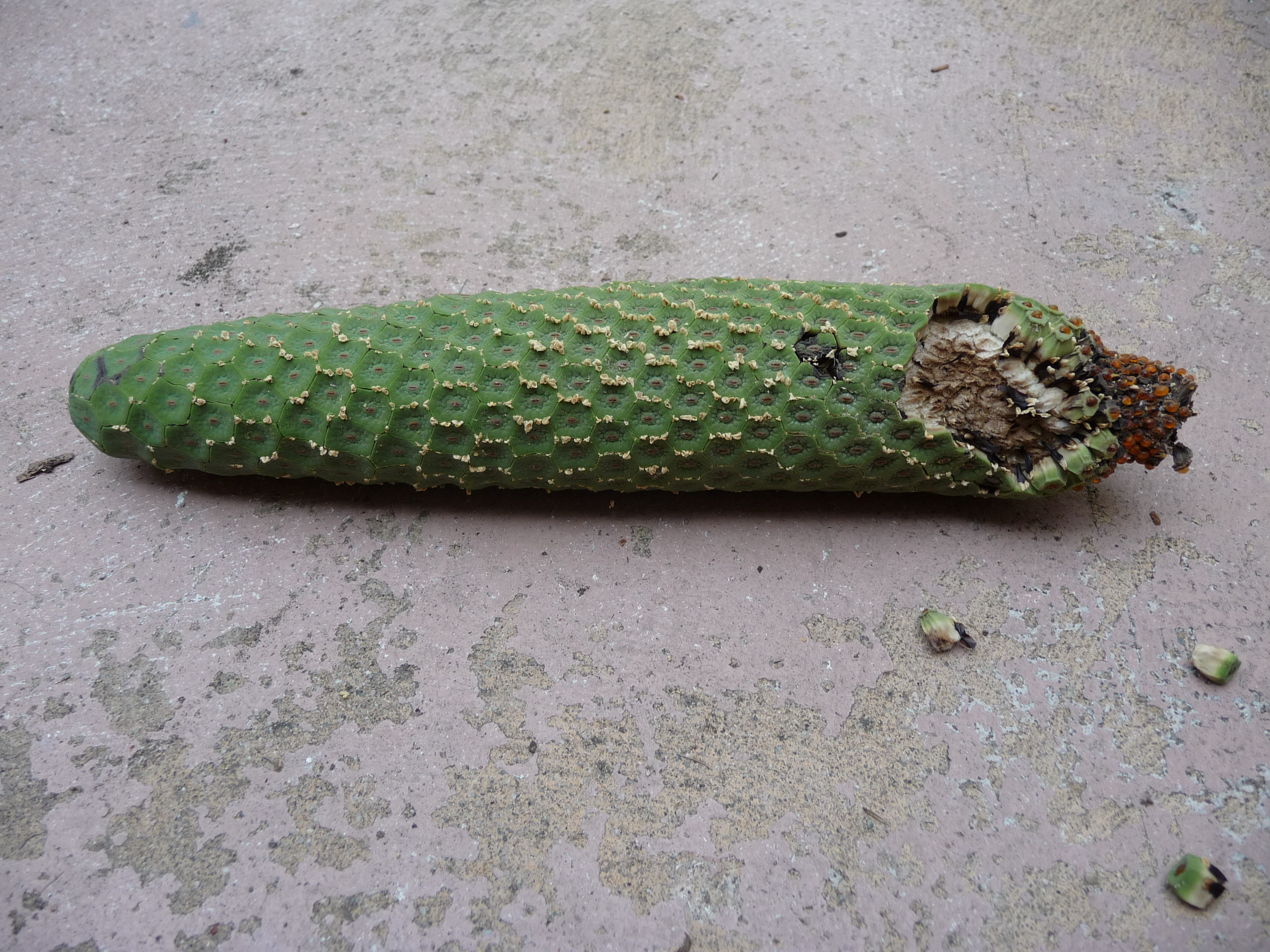
Fruit (unripe)

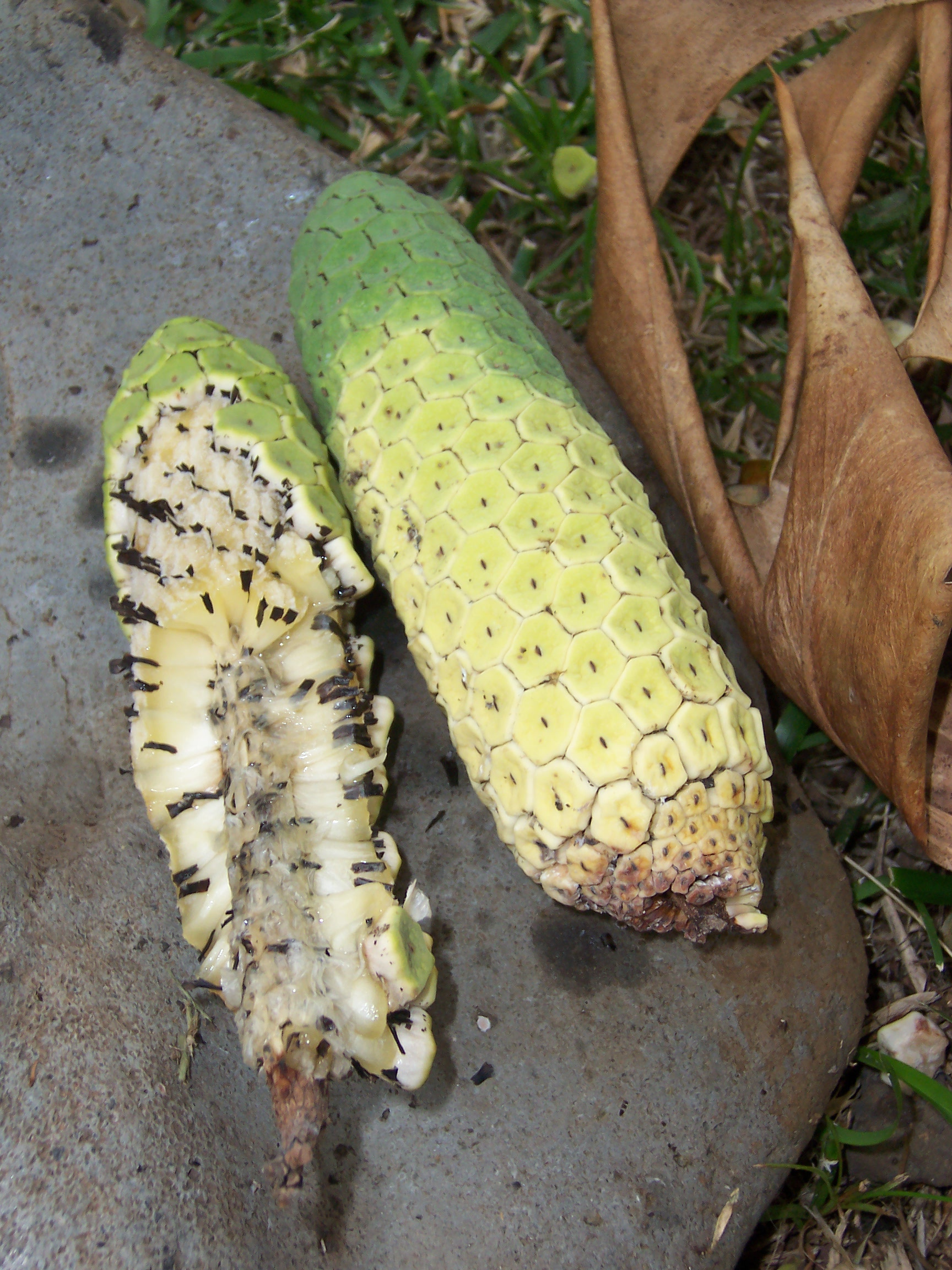
Fruit ripening

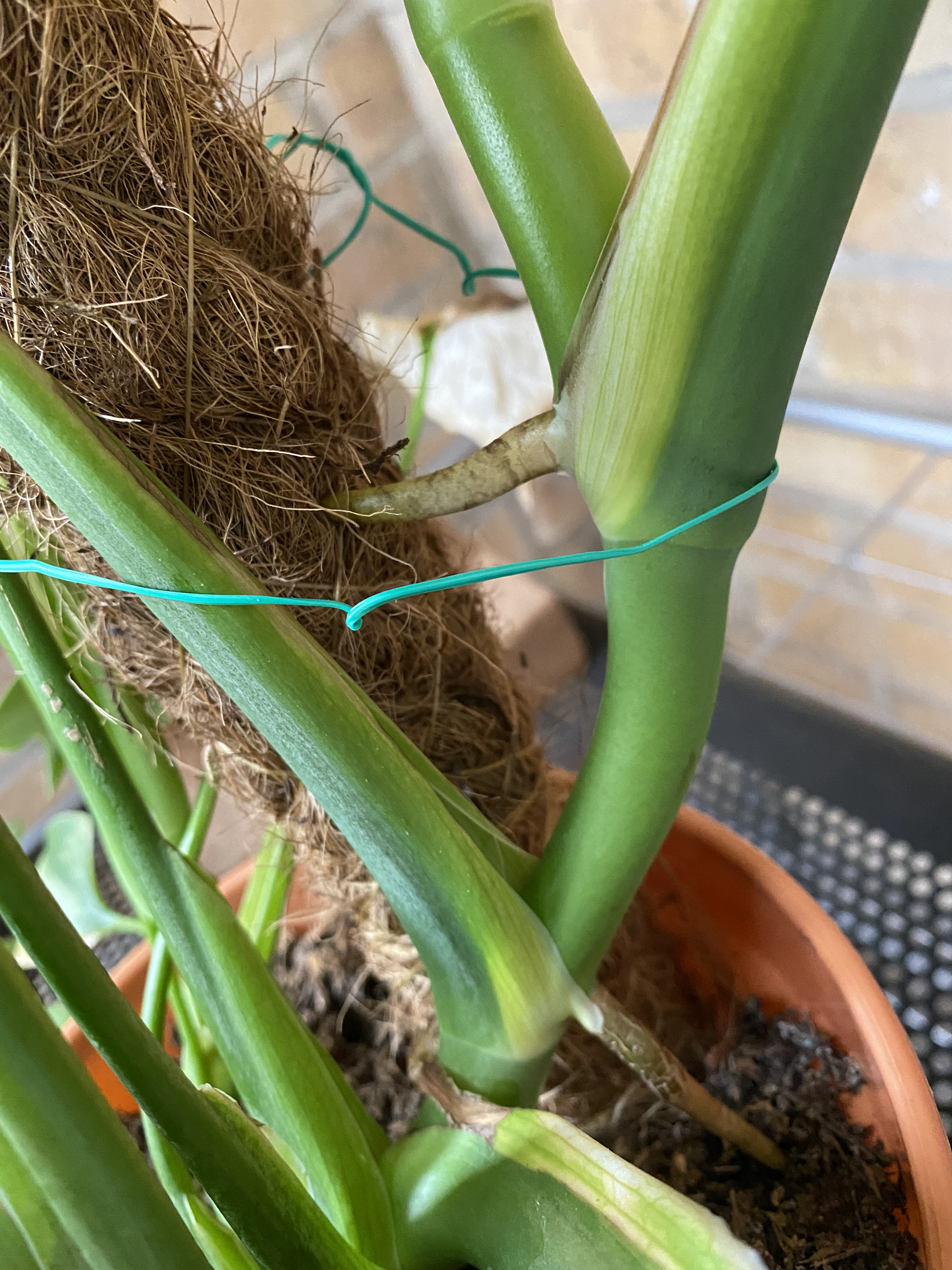
Aerial root growing into a coconut coir pole

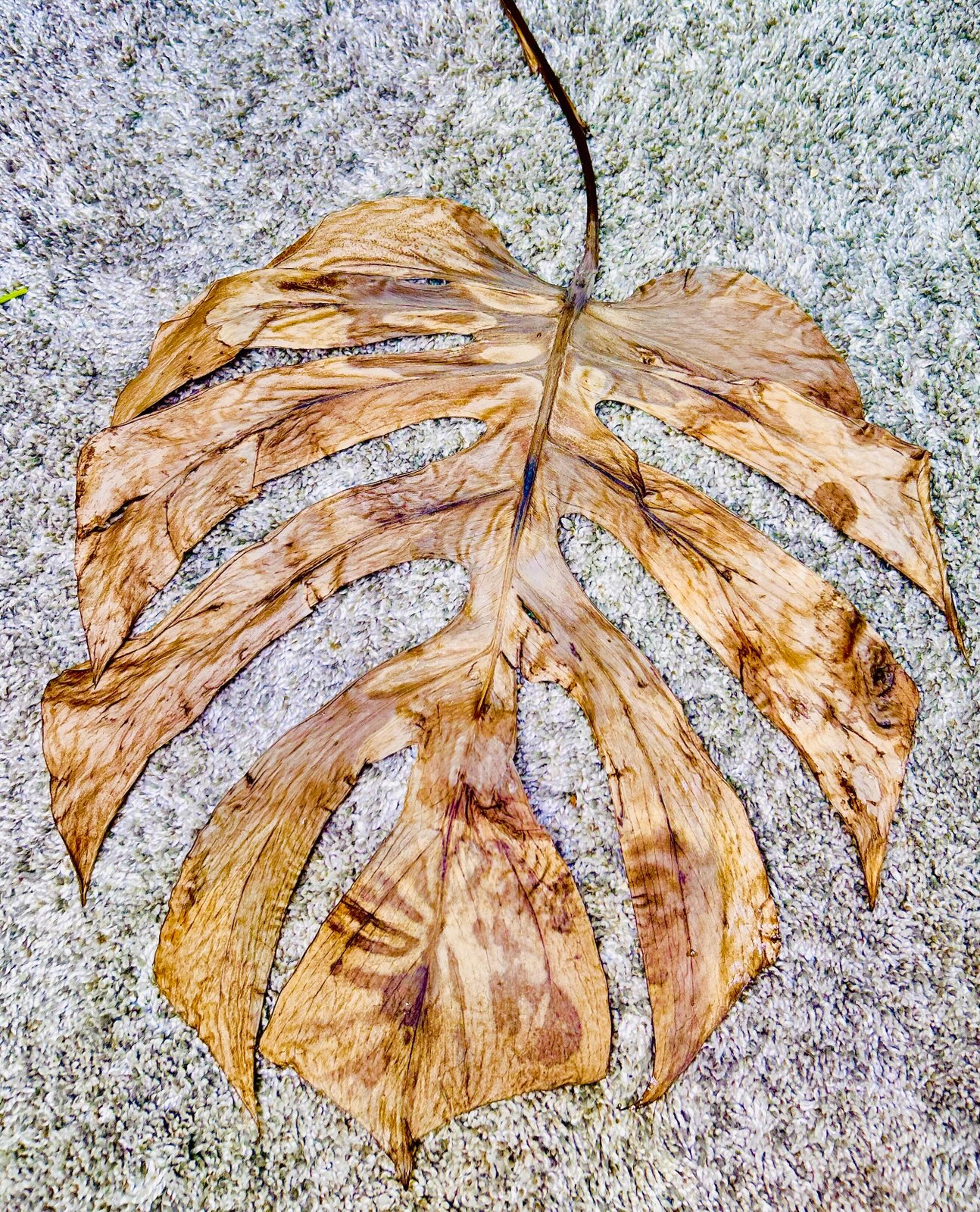
Dried adolescent leaf
