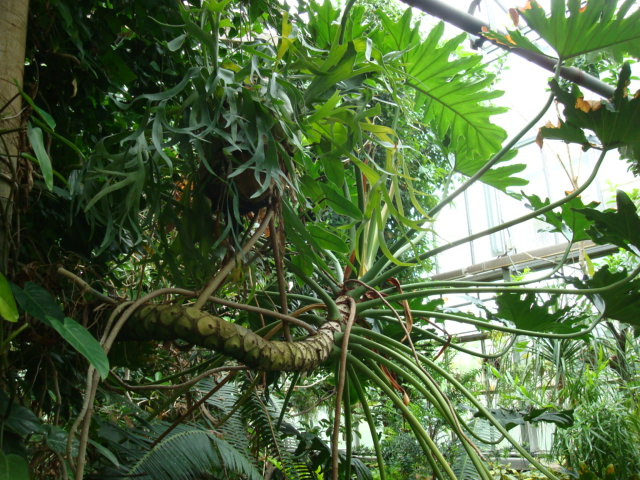

Scientific classification
- Kingdom: Plantae
- Clade: Embryophytes
- Clade: Tracheophytes
- Clade: Angiosperms
- Clade: Monocots
- Order: Alismatales
- Family: Araceae
- Genus: Philodendron
- Species: P. bipinnatifidum

Binomial name
- Philodendron bipinnatifidum Schott ex Endl.

Synonyms
- Arum pinnatifidum Vell., nom. illeg.; Philodendron pygmaeum Chodat & Vischer; Philodendron selloum K.Koch; Philodendron sellowii André; Sphincterostigma bipinnatifidum Schott, not validly publ.; Thaumatophyllum bipinnatifidum (Schott ex Endl.) Sakur.

= Philodendron bipinnatifidum =

Species of epiphyte

Philodendron bipinnatifidum, synonyms including Thaumatophyllum bipinnatifidum and Philodendron selloanum, (common names: split-leaf philodendron, lacy tree philodendron, selloum, horsehead philodendron, guaimbé) is a plant in the genus Philodendron, in the family Araceae. The species is native to South America, namely to Brazil, Bolivia, Argentina, and Paraguay, but is also cultivated as a landscape plant in tropical, subtropical and warm temperate climates.

The common name "split-leaf philodendron" is also used for Monstera deliciosa.

== Description ==
=== Growth habitat ===
Philodendron bipinnatifidum is a tropical plant that is usually grown in full sun, but can tolerate and adapt to deep shade. It grows best in rich, moisture-retentive soil that can be slightly alkaline. However, it cannot tolerate high salt concentration in soil. It is capable of supporting itself at massive heights by producing tree-like bases. However, it will exhibit epiphytic characteristics if given the opportunity to attach itself to a nearby supporting tree and climb upon it. The trunk of this plant can send down many strong aerial roots that not only give support to the overall plant mass, but also serve to absorb water and nutrients from the soil. This plant is greatly known for its ease in covering a land mass, and typically spread out its tree-like trunk from anywhere between eight and ten feet. Alternatively, if grown in cooler climates with at least some freezing winter weather, its entire aboveground structures will die back completely at a hard frost and then sprout back from the roots the following spring.

=== Distinguishing features ===
The leaves are simple, large, deeply lobed, and are usually drooping. These can grow up to 1.5 meters long, and are attached to long, smooth petioles. They are a deep green color, and since these plants are grown in the tropics, there is no apparent color change that correlates with the fall season. The trunk of P. bipinnatifidum is relatively thick and woody with characteristic "eye-drop" leaf scars. Approximately 15–20 years is required for P. bipinnatifidum to grow to an appropriate size and produce flowers in an indoor environment where space is limited. The small, petalless flowers are on a spadix that is enclosed within a spathe. They are usually white or inflorescent.

=== Reproduction ===
The reproductive organ consists of a spadix grown at the center of a reproductive layer called the spathe. The spathe is sometimes mistaken to be a flower, but it is really a modified leaf that serves to protect the spadix. The spadix is divided into three sections: fertile male flowers at the tip, sterile male flowers at the center, and fertile female flowers toward the end of the flower chamber. The sterile male flowers in the midsection serve to prevent self-fertilization and to produce heat. Pollination is done by Erioscelis and Cyclocephala beetle species. The sterile male flowers produce and maintain a constant temperature of 34 °C (93 °F), ( temperatures as high as 115 F (46 C) have been recorded) independent of the environment, during the two days the entire flower structure is open by burning stored fatty tissue – comparable to the metabolic output of a small cat. P. bipinnatifidum metabolizes fat, instead of carbohydrate, to fuel this process. This feature indicates a possible evolutionary convergence where this plant species and animal species derived similar mechanisms to utilize fat reserves for energy consumption. The main reason for raising and maintaining the flower's temperature is for volatilizing and dispersing insect-attracting odors. The constant high heat production increases the distance that the scent can be picked up by the beetle, and increases the probability of pollination. Additionally, the heat creates a hospitable climate that helps to stimulate beetle activity once it is inside the flower and induce them to mate (this being a favorable temperature for them to do so). This will also increase the probability of pollination as they linger inside it.

== Taxonomy ==
Heinrich Wilhelm Schott (1794–1865), one of the earliest botanists who studied the family Araceae, made extensive studies of philodendrons. The names Philodendron bipinnatifidum and Philodendron selloanum were accepted as two separate species in the past. However, recent studies focused on the sexual characteristics suggest that they are multiform of the same species. Botanist Simon Mayo documented that these were names of the same plant species that exhibited slight anatomical differences. Since the name Philodendron bipinnatifidum was the first of the two to be published in the literatures, it was accepted as the scientific name.

P. bipinnatifidum was placed in subgenus Meconostigma. In 2018 it was proposed that this subgenus be recognized as a separate genus, Thaumatophyllum. As of October 2025, Plants of the World Online and other taxonomic databases did not accept Thaumatophyllum, treating it as a synonym of Philodendron.

== Cultivation ==
P. bipinnatifidum is cultivated as a landscape plant in many tropical, subtropical and warm temperate countries including the Philippines, throughout Australia, the gulf coast and east coast of the United States, including Florida and California, and in South Africa and northern New Zealand. It is grown as a houseplant in cool temperate regions. It has gained the Royal Horticultural Society's Award of Garden Merit. Certain selections have successfully overwintered in climates as cold as Raleigh, North Carolina, at Juniper Level Botanic Garden.

== Toxicology ==
P. bipinnatifidum sap may cause skin irritation. Chewing and/or ingesting parts of the plant may result in severe swelling and compromised respiratory functions.

== Gallery ==
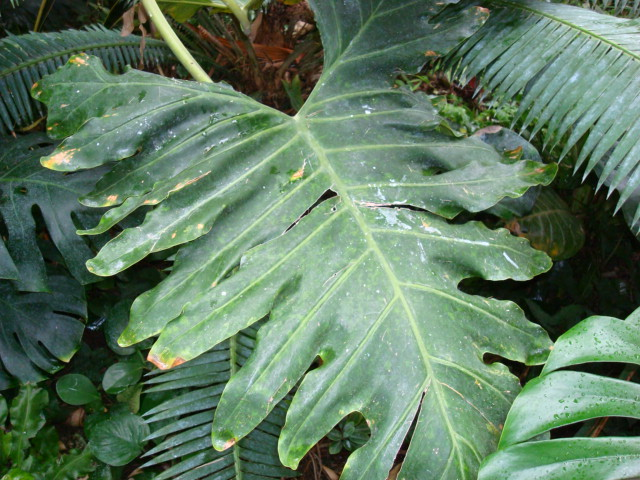
Leaf at the Boston University Greenhouse

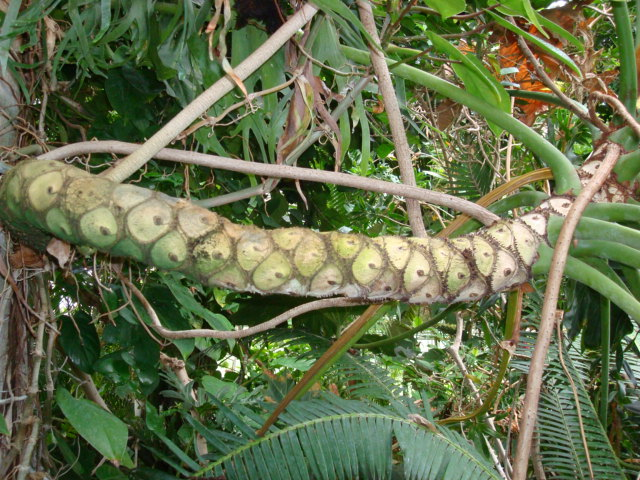
Eye-drop leaf scars on the stem

== See also ==
- List of Philodendron species
