= JC Raulston Arboretum =

Arboretum and botanical garden in Raleigh, North Carolina

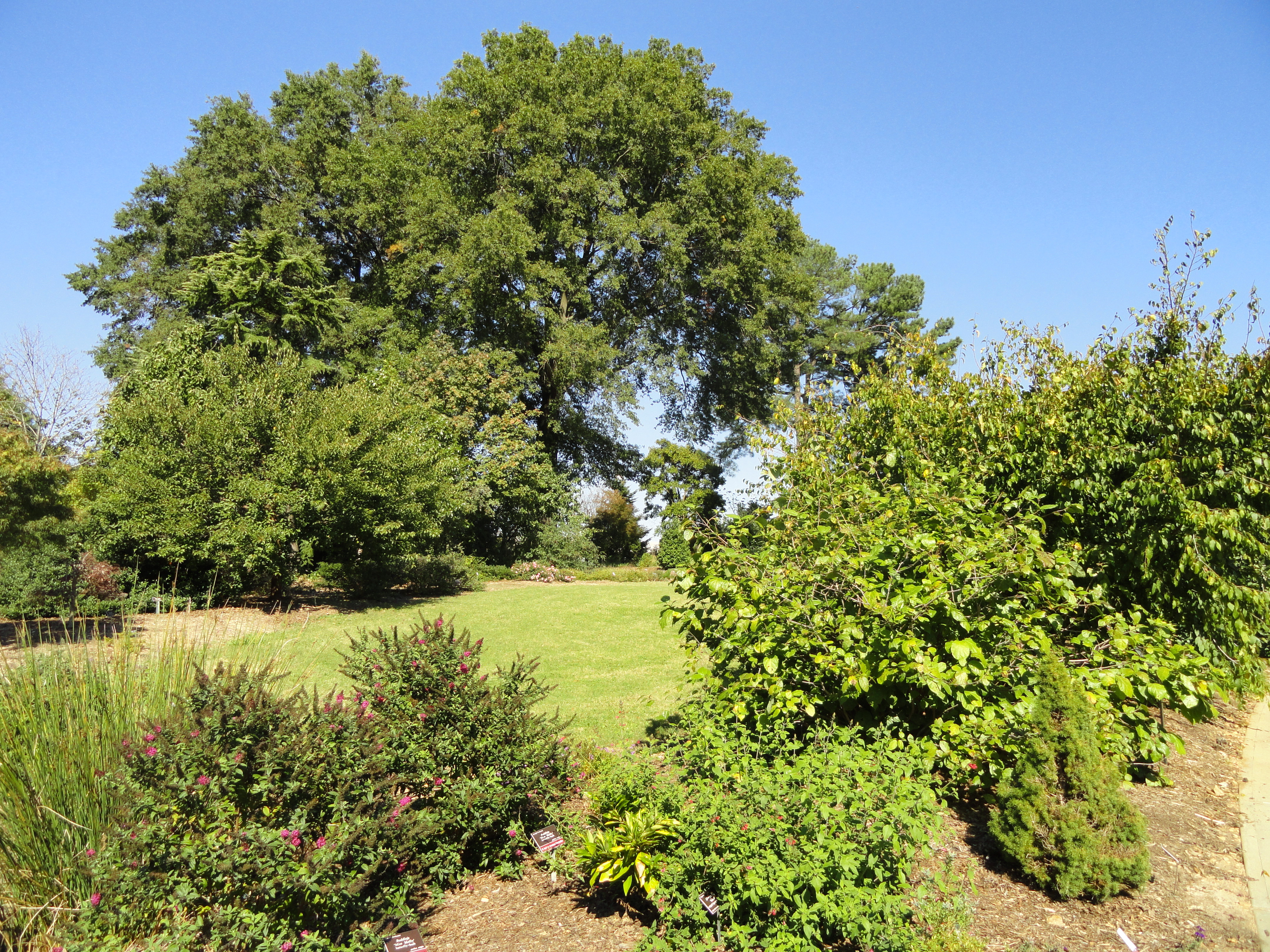

- Location within North Carolina Location within the United States
- Type: Arboretum, Botanical garden
- Location: 4415 Beryl Road, Raleigh, North Carolina
- Coordinates: 35.7945°N 78.6991°W
- Area: 10 acres (4.0 ha)
- Opened: 1976
- Founder: James Chester Raulston
- Operator: North Carolina State University
- Status: Open year round
- Website: jcra.ncsu.edu

The JC Raulston Arboretum is a 10-acre (40,000 m^{2}) arboretum and botanical garden administered by North Carolina State University, and located in Raleigh, North Carolina. The arboretum is open daily to the public without charge.

== History ==
The Arboretum was established in 1976 by horticulturist Dr. James Chester Raulston, and after Dr. Raulston's death in 1996, the Arboretum was re-named in his honor.

== Plant collections ==
The arboretum has a collection of plants from over 50 countries. Its plant collections now include over 6,000 total taxa of annuals, perennials, bulbs, vines, ground covers, shrubs, and trees, with significant collections of:

- Acer (maple)
- Aesculus (buckeye)
- Berberis (barberry)
- Buxus (boxwood)
- Cercis (redbud)
- Conifers
- Ilex (holly)
- Magnolia (magnolia)
- Mahonia (grapeholly)
- Nandina (heavenly bamboo)
- Quercus (oak)
- Styracaceae (silverbell family)
- Viburnum
- Wisteria

== The major gardens ==
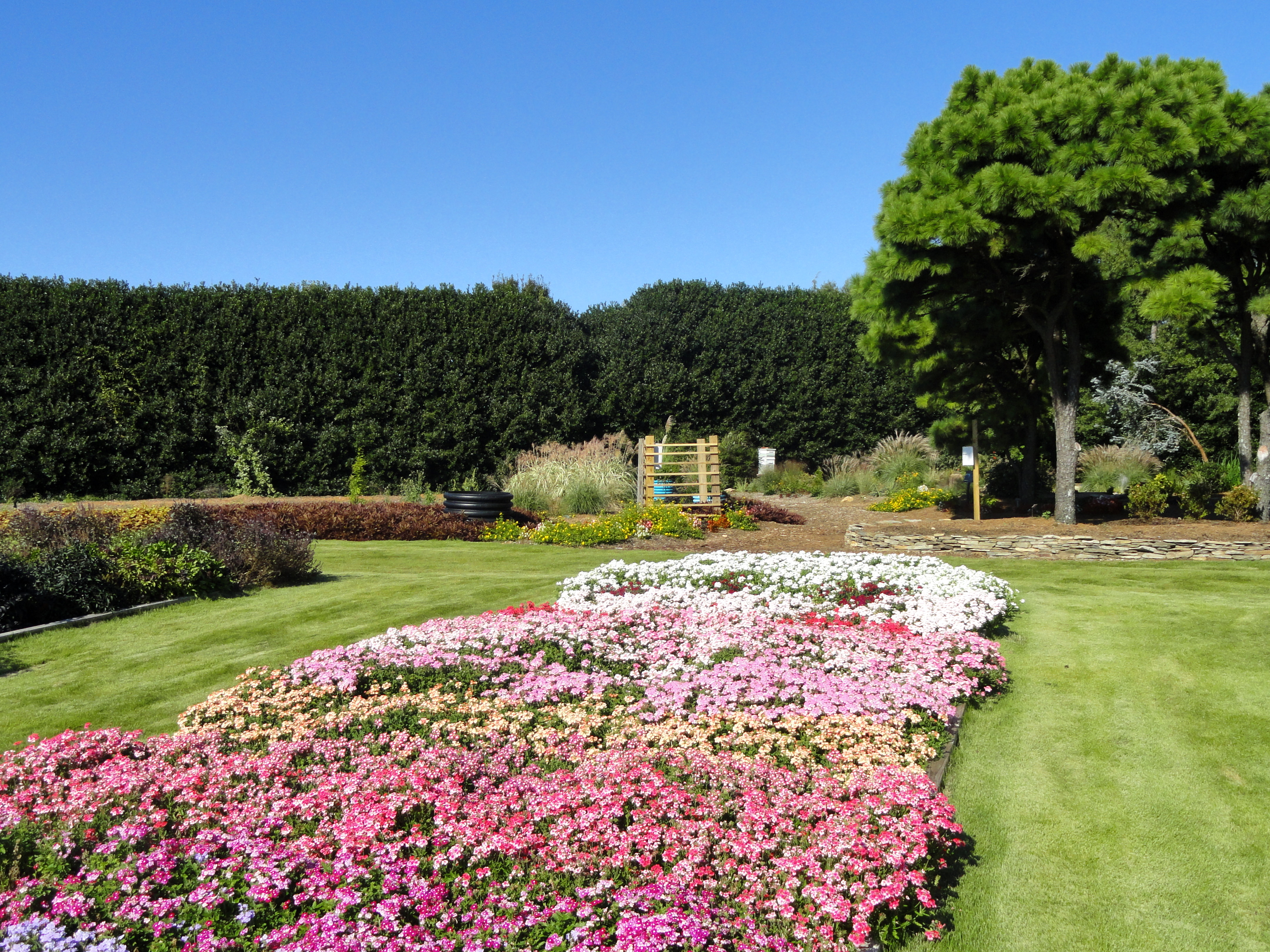
Annual Color Trials

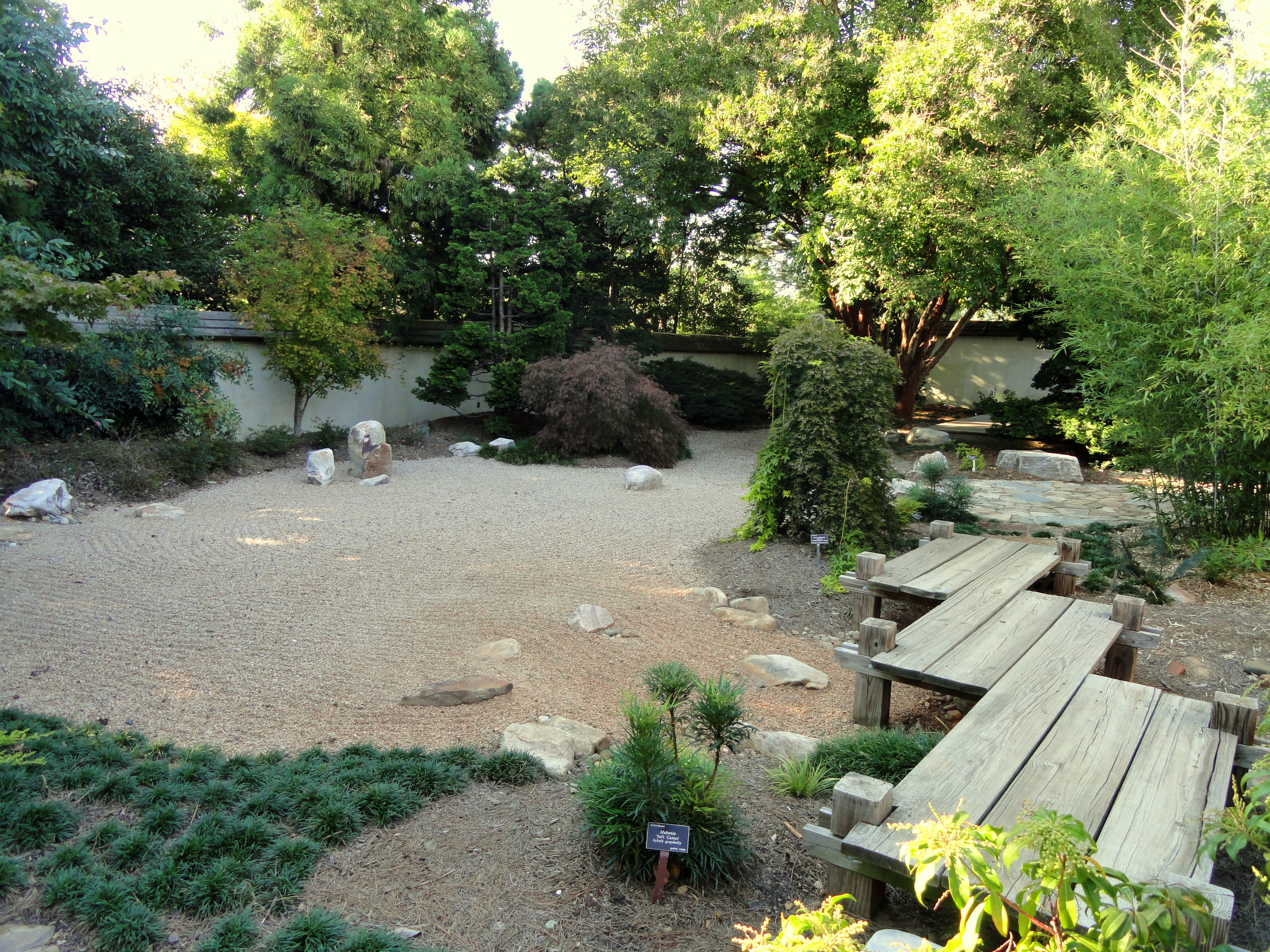
Japanese Garden

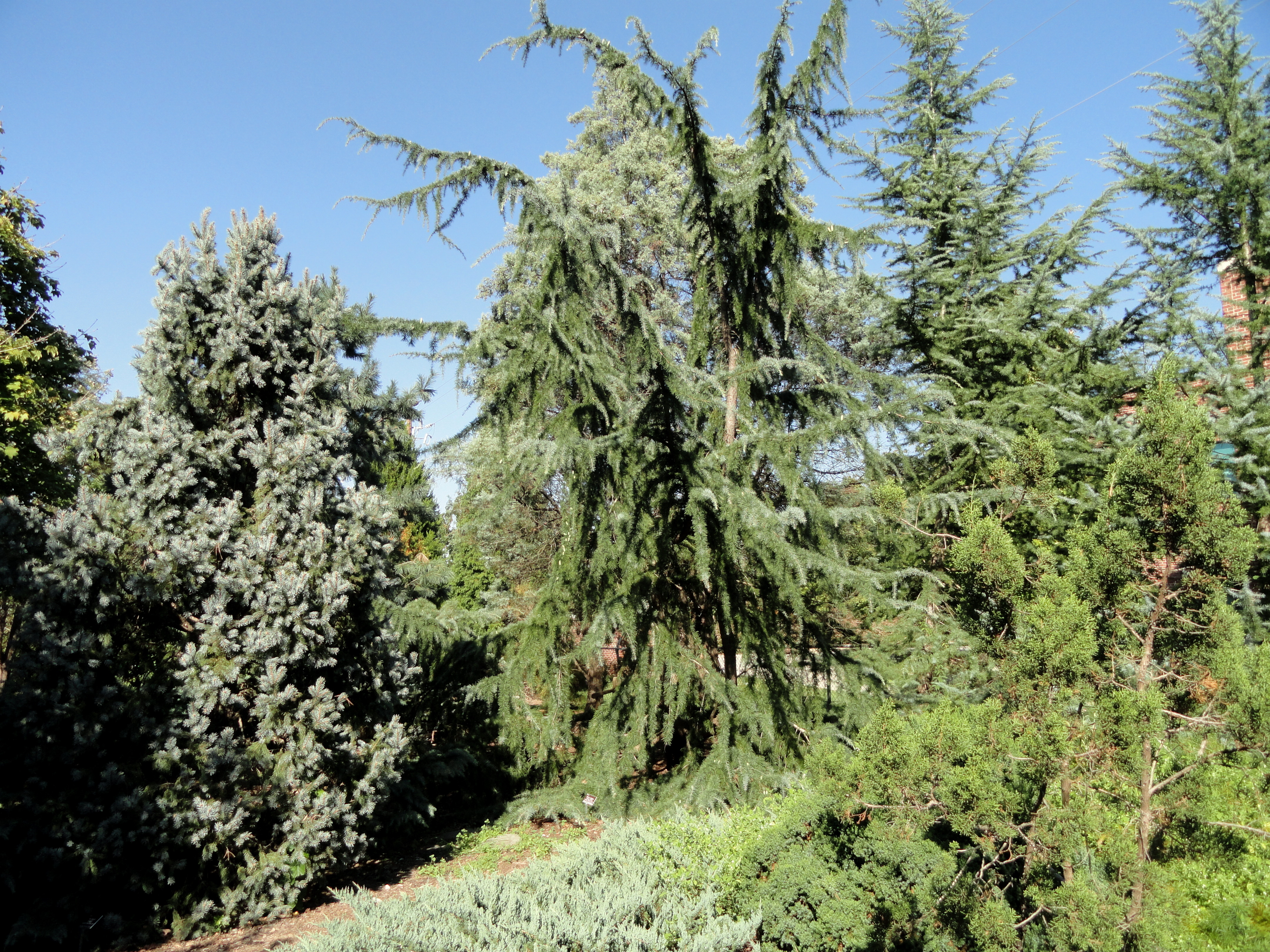
Conifers

- Annual Color Trials — an official All-America Selections (AAS) testing site, evaluating over 700 different annuals and tender perennials each year.
- Entry Garden — more than 100 types of tender perennials, mostly tropical.
- Finley-Nottingham Rose Garden — over 200 roses representing over 120 taxa, including hybrid teas, hybrid musk roses, David Austin roses, and climbing roses.
- Japanese Garden — Japanese plants with a raked-stone Zen garden; plants include Acer palmatum ‘Kiyohime’, Acer palmatum ‘Seiryu’, Chamaecyparis obtusa ‘Nana Gracilis’, Lagerstroemia fauriei, Nandina domestica f. capillaris cultivars, and Pinus taeda ‘Nana’.
- Klein-Pringle White Garden — white-flowered plants and plants with gray, white, or silver foliage, inspired by the famous White Garden at Sissinghurst Castle Garden; plants include Acer palmatum, Lagerstroemia ‘Natchez’, Magnolia × loebneri ‘Merrill’, Styrax japonicus ‘Emerald Pagoda’, and Viburnum ‘Mohawk’.
- Lath House — over 700 kinds of shade-loving plants, including Acanthus spinosus, Cornus controversa 'Variegata', Farfugium japonicum 'Aureomaculatum', Gentiana saponaria, Hydrangea macrophylla ‘Pia’, Pieris japonica ‘Shojo’, and Trochodendron aralioides.
- Mixed Border — a large border planting (300 × 15 feet) (91 × 4.6 m) of trees, shrubs, groundcovers, perennials, and bulbs; plants include Campsis grandiflora 'Morning Calm', Chamaecyparis thyoides 'Rubicon', Clematis 'Betty Corning', Cornus sericea 'Silver and Gold', and Hamamelis × intermedia ‘Jelena’.
- Model Gardens — home demonstration gardens.
- Paradise Garden — for the senses of sight, sound, taste, touch, and smell; plants include Aloysia triphylla, Corylus avellana ‘Contorta’, Hosta ‘Sum and Substance’, and Ziziphus jujuba ‘Inermis’.
- Perennial Border — nearly 1,000 plants in a large border planting (450 × 18 feet) (140 × 5.5 m), with color scheme based upon a plan by Gertrude Jekyll.
- Southall Memorial Garden — a hemlock tree grove, with mixed plantings and an open grassy area for gatherings.
- Xeric Garden — plants from Mexico and the American Southwest, including Agave, Dasylirion, Echinocactus, Hesperaloe, Nolina, Opuntia, and Yucca.
- Winter Garden — plants at their best in winter, including Cryptomeria, Chamaecyparis, Cornus officinalis 'Kintoki', Edgeworthia chrysantha, Epimedium, Hamamelis, Helleborus × hybridus, Ilex, Iris unguicularis, Prunus mume 'Rose Glow', and Yucca.

== Gallery ==
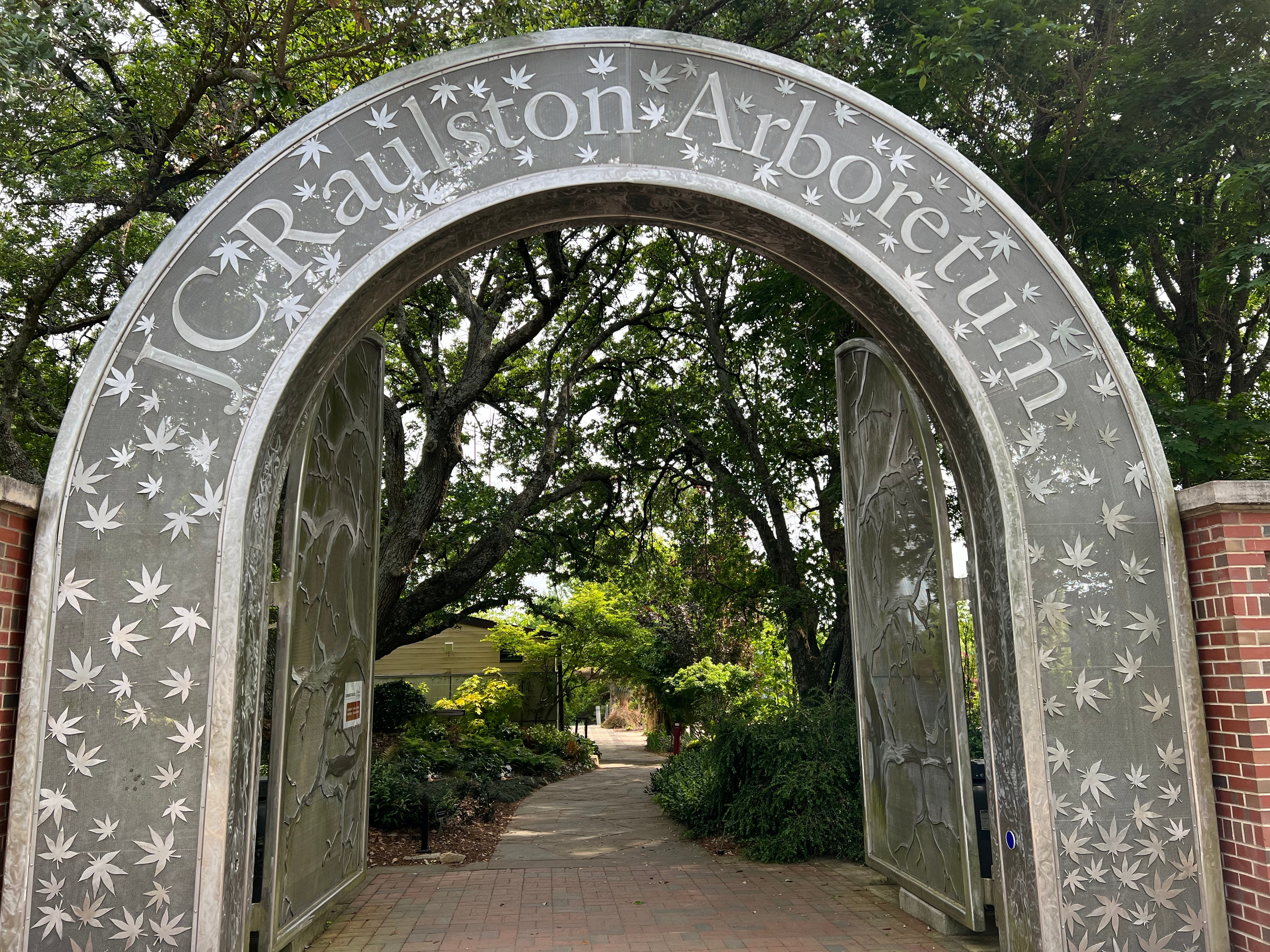
Entrance to the Raulston Aboretum

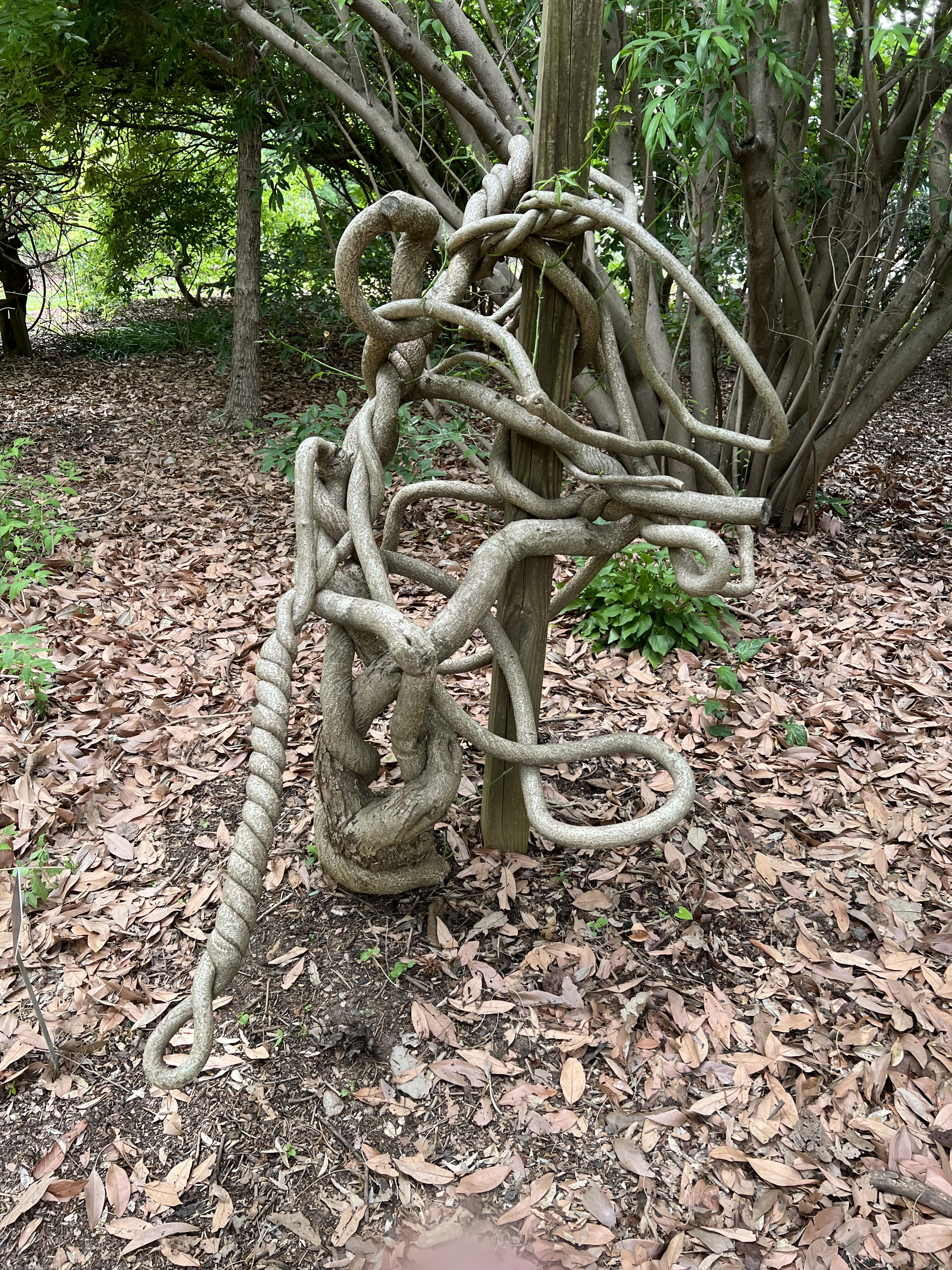
Twisted Raulston Arboretum

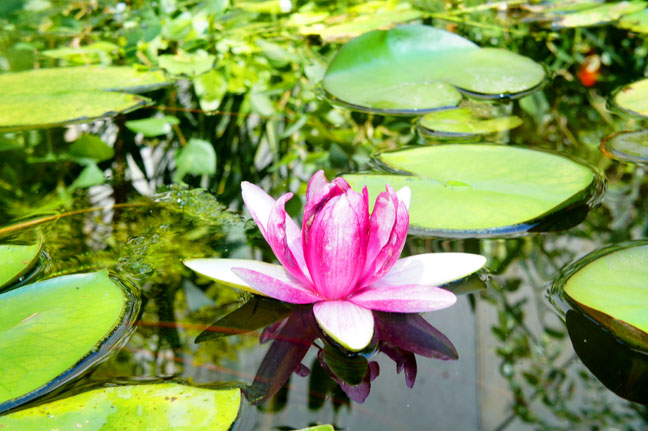
Water lily in a pond at the Arboretum

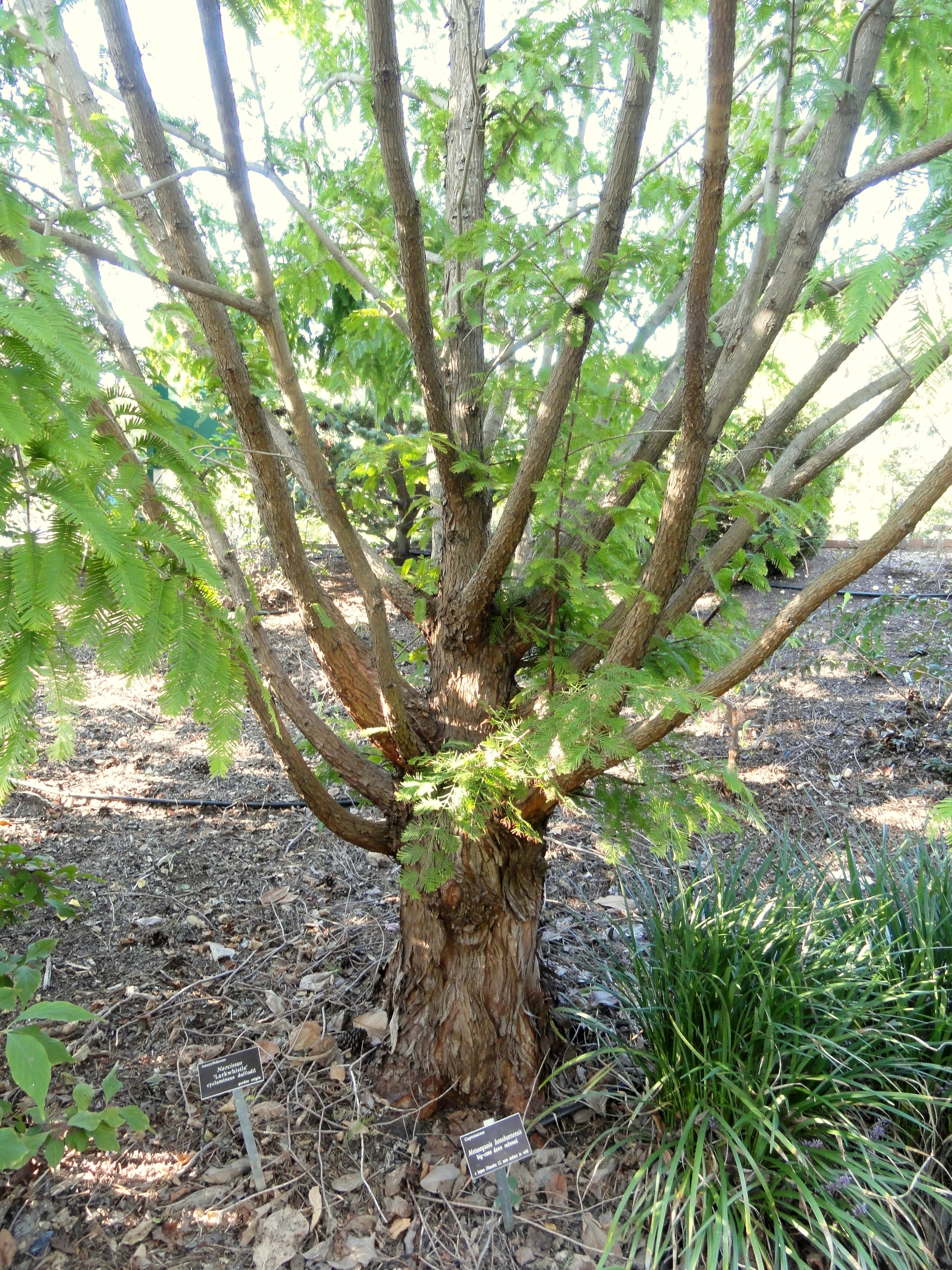
Metasequoia glyptostroboides (cultivated under synonym name "M. honshuenensis")

== See also ==
- List of botanical gardens in the United States
