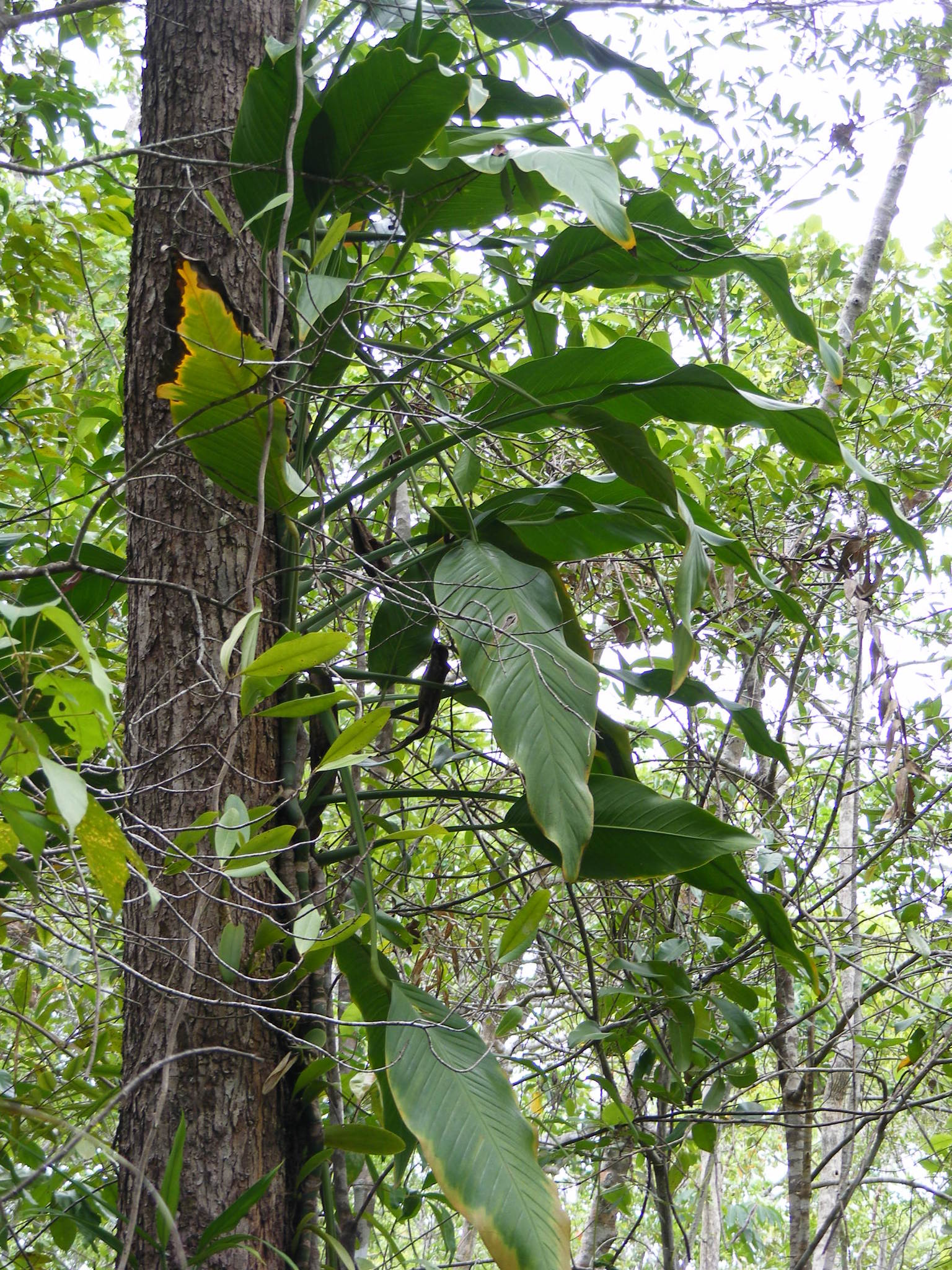
- Epipremnum amplissimum growing in Australia

Scientific classification
- Kingdom: Plantae
- Clade: Tracheophytes
- Clade: Angiosperms
- Clade: Monocots
- Order: Alismatales
- Family: Araceae
- Genus: Epipremnum
- Species: E. amplissimum

Binomial name
- Epipremnum amplissimum Schott

Synonyms
- Rhaphidophora amplissima

= Epipremnum amplissimum =

Species of plant

Epipremnum amplissimum is a species of flowering plant in the genus Epipremnum, native to Southeast Asia, from New Guinea to Vanuatu including northern Australia.

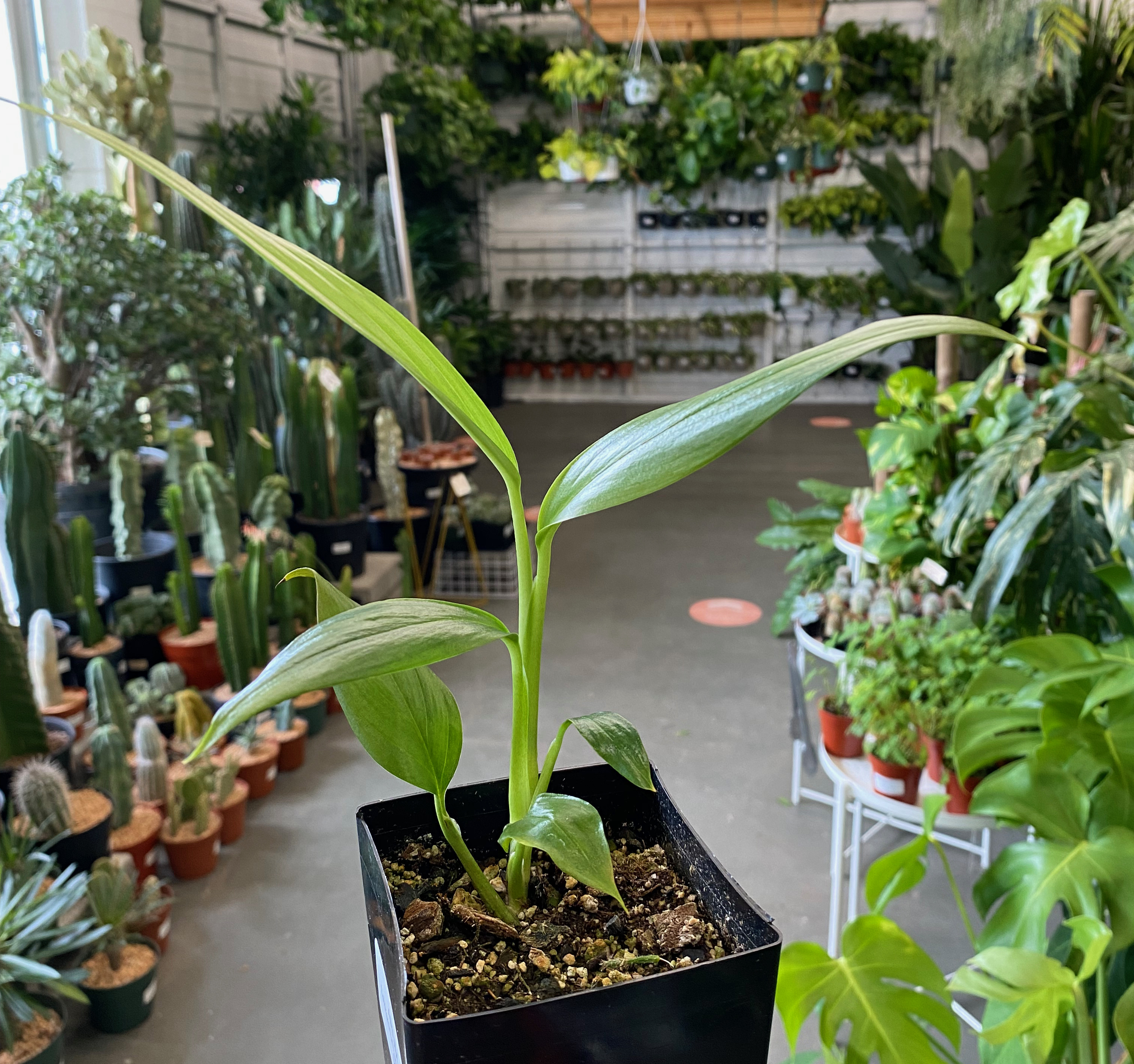
Juvenile E. amplissimum potted as a houseplant

Like the more commonly known Epipremnum aureum (Pothos), it is an evergreen vine typically on a tree as an epiphyte. Unlike the fenestrations of Epipremnum pinnatum, this species does not develop dramatically new leaf shapes when climbing, with young foliage having a narrow elliptic shape and then increasing in length and breadth as it grows. The plant is most commonly kept in cultivation in its juvenile state, where it may have blue-gray variegation that disappears with maturity.
