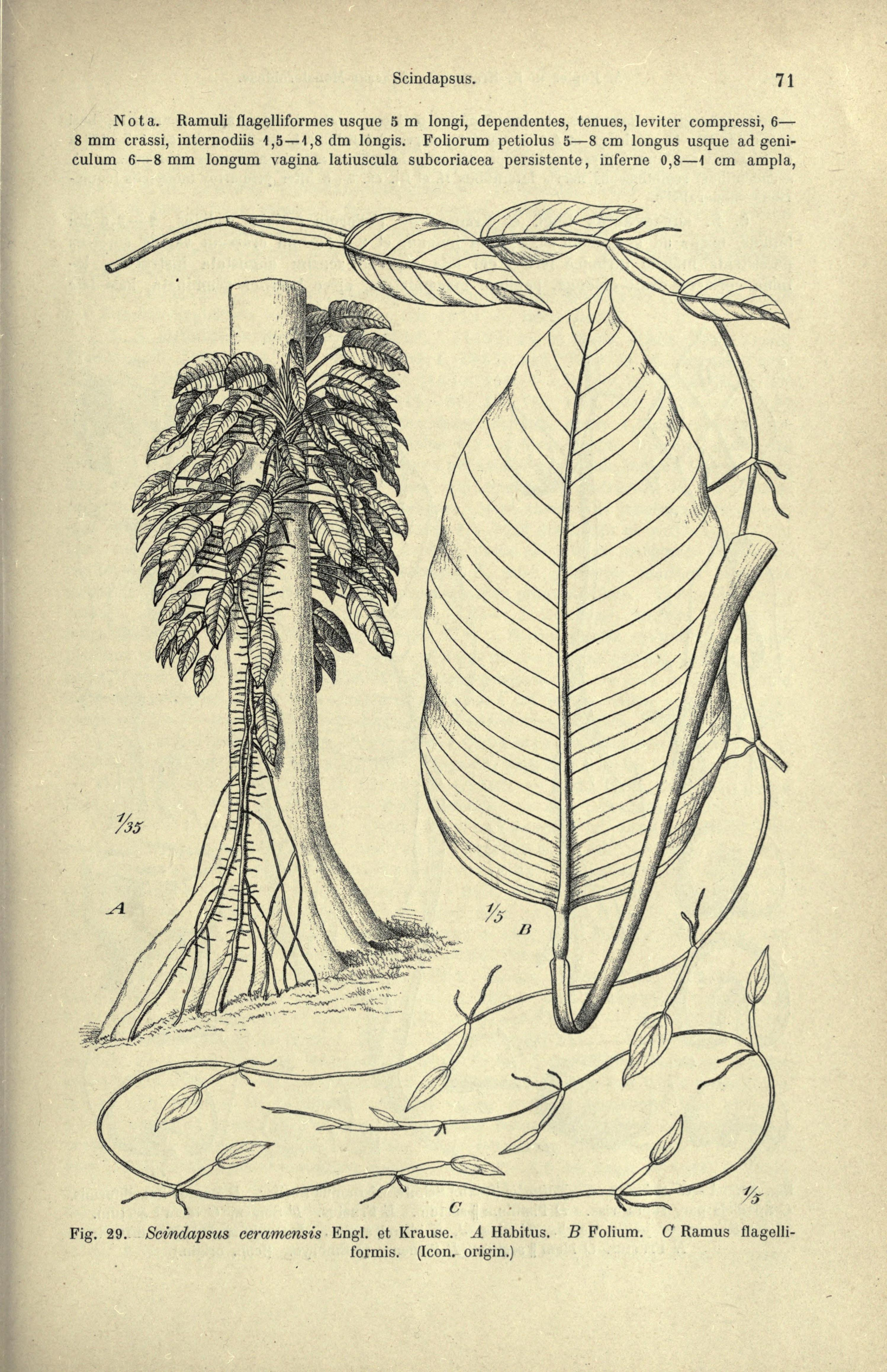

Scientific classification
- Kingdom: Plantae
- Clade: Tracheophytes
- Clade: Angiosperms
- Clade: Monocots
- Order: Alismatales
- Family: Araceae
- Genus: Epipremnum
- Species: E. ceramense

Binomial name
- Epipremnum ceramense (Engl. & K.Krause) Alderw., 1920

Synonyms
- Epipremnum ceramense var. flavispathum Alderw., 1920; Scindapsus ceramensis Engl. & K.Krause, 1908

= Epipremnum ceramense =

Species of flowering plant

Epipremnum ceramense is a plant species of family Araceae. This type of woody vine is endemic in Maluku Islands' rainforest.

== Name ==
The specific name ceramense was taken from the plant's locality Seram Island, which was formerly called Ceram Island.
