= Epipremnum silvaticum =

Scientific classification
- Kingdom: Plantae
- Clade: Tracheophytes
- Clade: Angiosperms
- Clade: Monocots
- Order: Alismatales
- Family: Araceae
- Genus: Epipremnum
- Species: E. silvaticum

Binomial name
- Epipremnum silvaticum Alderw.

Species of plant

Epipremnum silvaticum is a flowering plant belonging to the genus Epipremnum, and the family Araceae. It is a perennial evergreen vine.

It has a liana growth style. It climbs via aerial roots and grows up to 6 meters (~19 feet). The adult plant's stem has a thickness of 5–10 mm with internodes 0.5–2 centimeters long.

It can be found in the island of Sumatra in Indonesia.
