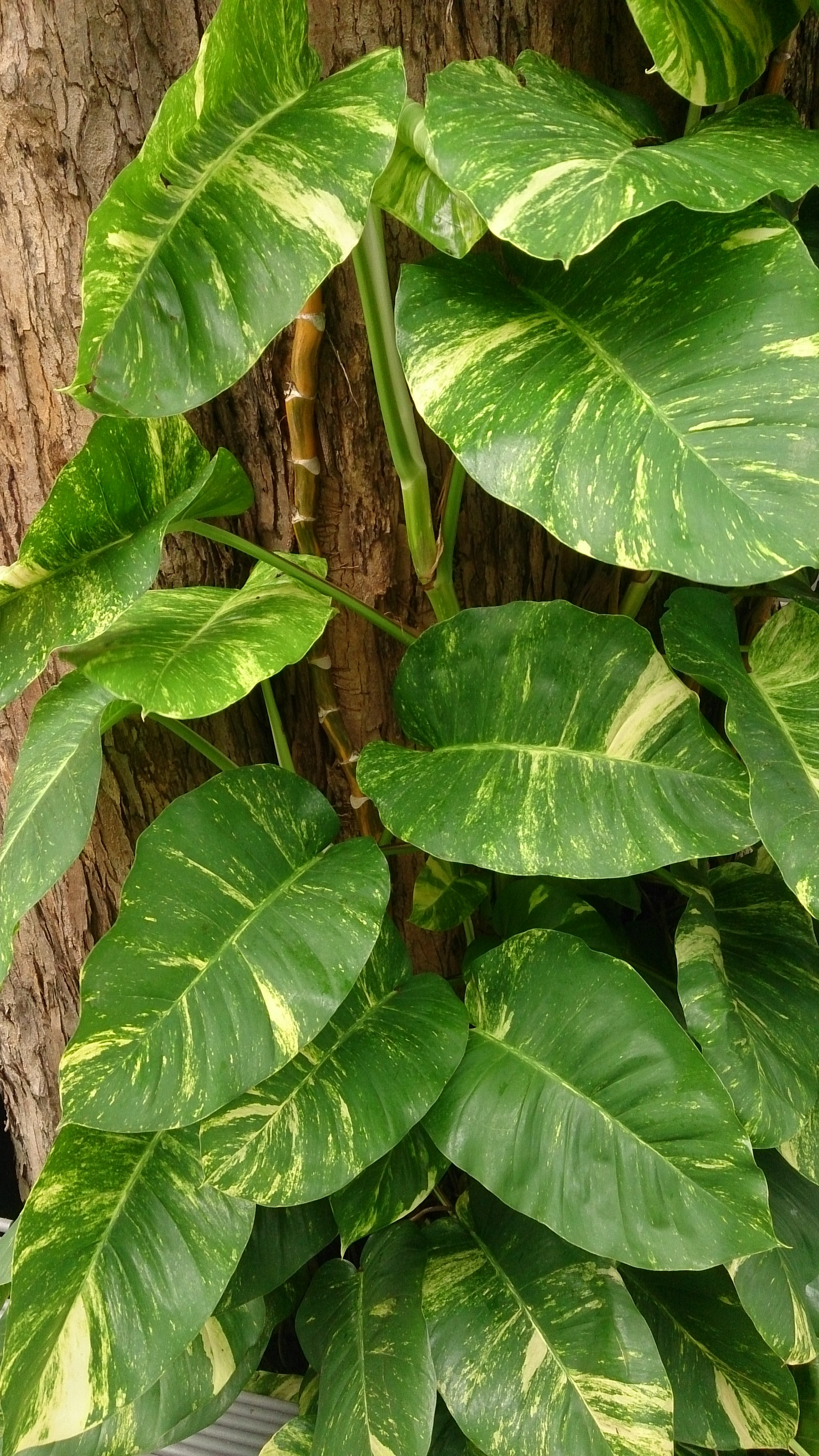
- Matured Epipremnum aureum or golden pothos

Scientific classification
- Kingdom: Plantae
- Clade: Tracheophytes
- Clade: Angiosperms
- Clade: Monocots
- Order: Alismatales
- Family: Araceae
- Genus: Epipremnum
- Species: E. aureum

Binomial name
- Epipremnum aureum (Linden & André) G.S.Bunting, 1964

Synonyms
- Epipremnum mooreense Nadeaud, 1899; Pothos aureus Linden & André, 1880; Rhaphidophora aurea (Linden & André) Birdsey, 1963; Scindapsus aureus (Linden & André) Engl., 1908

= Epipremnum aureum =

Species of plant

Epipremnum aureum is a species in the arum family Araceae, native to Mo'orea in the Society Islands of French Polynesia. The species is a popular houseplant in temperate regions, but has also become naturalised in tropical and sub-tropical forests worldwide, including northern South Africa, Australia, Southeast Asia, the Indian subcontinent, the Pacific Islands and the West Indies, where it has caused severe ecological damage in some cases.

The plant has a number of common names including golden pothos, Ceylon creeper, hunter's robe, ivy arum, silver vine, Solomon Islands ivy, and taro vine. It is also called devil's vine or devil's ivy because it is very hardy and stays green even when kept in the dark. It is sometimes simply labelled Pothos, or mistakenly labelled as a Philodendron or Scindapsus in plant stores. It is commonly known as a money plant in many parts of the Indian subcontinent. It rarely flowers without artificial hormone supplements.

== History and etymology ==
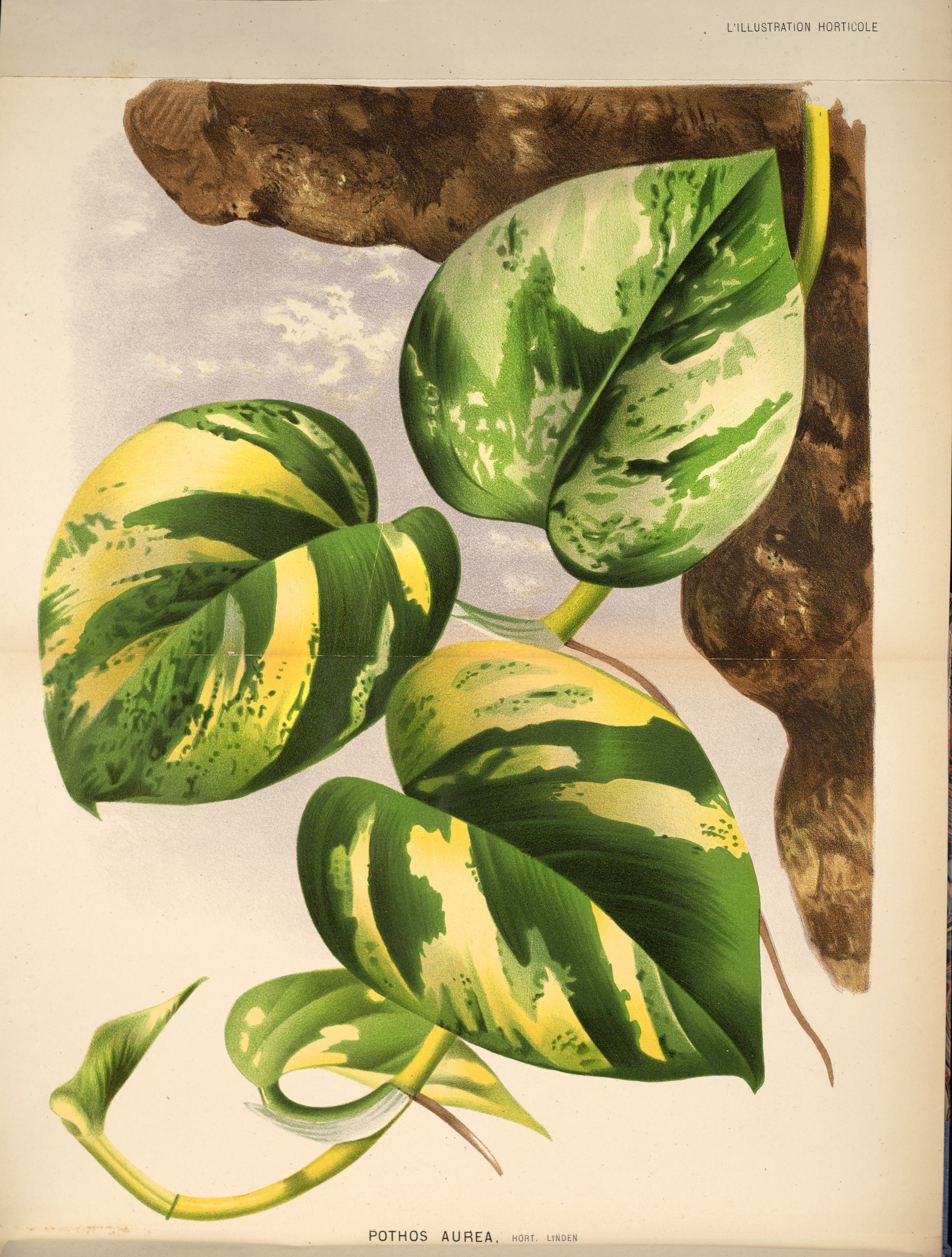
An illustration from 1871 described by Linden & André as Pothos aureus. Note that it is misspelled as "Pothos aurea".

This species has been assigned to a number of genera. In 1880, when it was first described, it was named Pothos aureus, which is why it is often commonly referred to as a "pothos". After an inflorescence was observed in 1962, it was given the new name of Rhaphidophora aurea. However, after closer examination of the flower, researchers noticed its heightened similarity to Epipremnum pinnatum and synonymised it with that species. Only after closer observation of the entirety of the plant, including the leaves and growth patterns, did researchers again separate it from E. pinnatum, and classify it as E. aureum. The plant has gained the Royal Horticultural Society's Award of Garden Merit.

== Description ==
Induced flowering

Epipremnum aureum is an evergreen vine growing to 20 m (66 ft) tall, with stems up to 4 cm (2 in) in diameter, climbing using aerial roots which adhere to surfaces. The leaves are alternate, heart-shaped, entire on juvenile plants, but irregularly pinnatifid on mature plants, up to 100 cm (39 in) long and 45 cm (18 in) broad; juvenile leaves are much smaller, typically under 20 cm (8 in) long.

The flowers are produced in a spathe up to 23 cm (9 in) long. This plant produces trailing stems when it climbs up trees and these take root when they reach the ground and grow along with it. The leaves on these trailing stems grow up to 10 cm (4 in) long and are the ones normally seen on this plant when it is cultivated as a potted plant.

=== Shy-flowering nature ===
While E. aureum is classified as an angiosperm, which typically produce flowers at some point in their lifecycle, it is the only reported species in its family (Araceae) that does not readily bloom, if at all. Regardless of where this "shy-flowering" plant is grown, or what the conditions are like, it will apparently not flower due to a genetic impairment of the gibberellin (GA) biosynthetic gene, EaGA3ox1. This impairment causes the plant to be unable to develop bioactive GAs, which are responsible for the flowering of plants, via the floral meristem identity gene EaLFY. It was found that when GAs were experimentally sprayed onto the plant, flowering was induced. Thus, it is likely safe to assume that none of the plants seen in modern cultivation have truly been grown from seed. However, it is far more efficient to simply multiply an existing plant by dividing it; the species is well known for its ease of propagation via vegetative growth, developing roots rapidly through cuttings, either rooted in water or grown directly in a well-aerated substrate, such as perlite mixed with vermiculite, or even sphagnum moss. Additional methods of propagation include whole-plant divisions or root divisions, as well as tissue culture propagation.

== Distribution ==
Originally, it was endemic to the island of Mo'orea from the Society Islands. However, it is now wild in many tropical countries. The following ranges are indicated: Bangladesh, India, Myanmar, Thailand, Vietnam, Hainan, Hong Kong, Taiwan, Japan, peninsular Malaysia, Sabah, Sarawak, Singapore, Java, Maluku Islands, Nusa Tenggara, Sulawesi, Sumatra, Philippines, Solomon Islands, Vanuatu, New Caledonia, New Guinea, Queensland, Marshall Islands, Hawaii, Palau, Fiji, Tonga, Cook Islands, and Western Samoa.

== Cultivation and uses ==
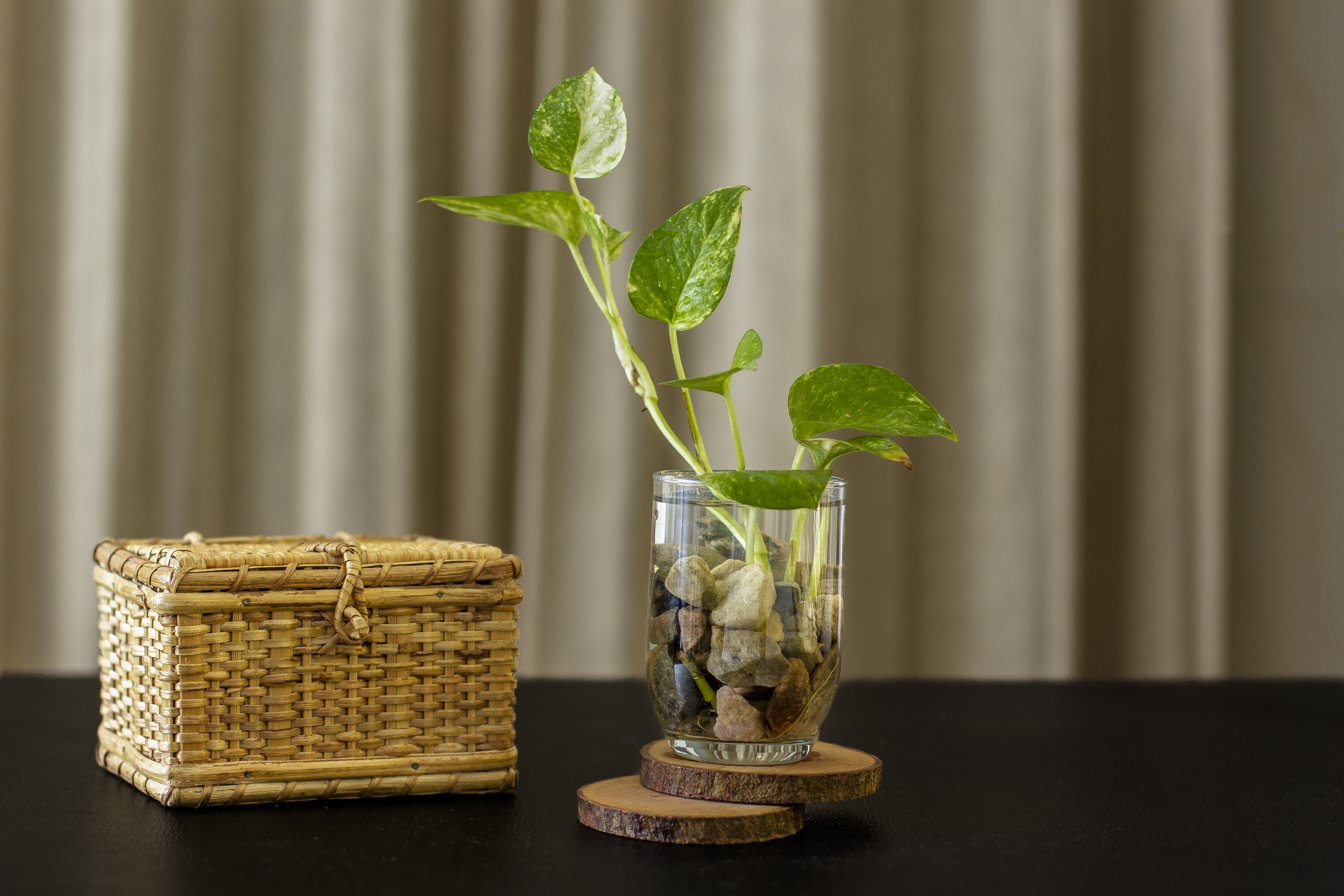
E. aureum in a small glass vase

In temperate regions, it is a popular houseplant with numerous cultivars selected for leaves with white, yellow, or light green variegation. It is often used in decorative displays in shopping centers, offices, and other public locations largely because it requires little care and is also attractively leafy. In tropical countries, it is found in many parks and gardens, and tends to grow naturally.

As an indoor plant it can reach more than 2 metres (2 yd) in height if given adequate support (a trellis or moss pole to climb), but hardly develops adult-sized leaves. The best results are achieved by providing indirect light; it tolerates an intense luminosity, but long periods of direct sunlight burn the leaves. It lives well with a temperature between 17 and 30 °C (63 and 86 °F). Generally, the plant will only need watering when the soil feels dry to the touch (typically once every one to two weeks). The plant should be fertilized every 2–3 months during its growing season, and at a reduced rate the rest of the year. It should be replanted at least every 1–2 years, or sooner if it becomes too root-bound. However, it is a very robust plant, and will survive bad growing conditions. The plant grows rapidly in hydroponic culture.

It can be cultivated from a cutting, however, this can carry various diseases such as Erwinia leaf spot, Pythium root rot, Rhizoctonia root rot (Rhizoctonia foot rot), Pseudomonas leaf spot, Southern blight, and Xanthomonas blight.

The plant can remove indoor pollutants such as formaldehyde, trichloroethene, toluene, xylene, and benzene in controlled circumstances (e.g. a sealed room). A study found that this effect declined as the molecular weight of the polluting substance increased.

The plant is sometimes used in aquariums, placed on top of the aquarium, and allowed to grow roots in the water. This is beneficial to the plant and the aquarium as it absorbs nitrates, using them for growth.

== Propagation ==
The plant can be propagated in soil or in water.

== Cultivars ==
Cultivars

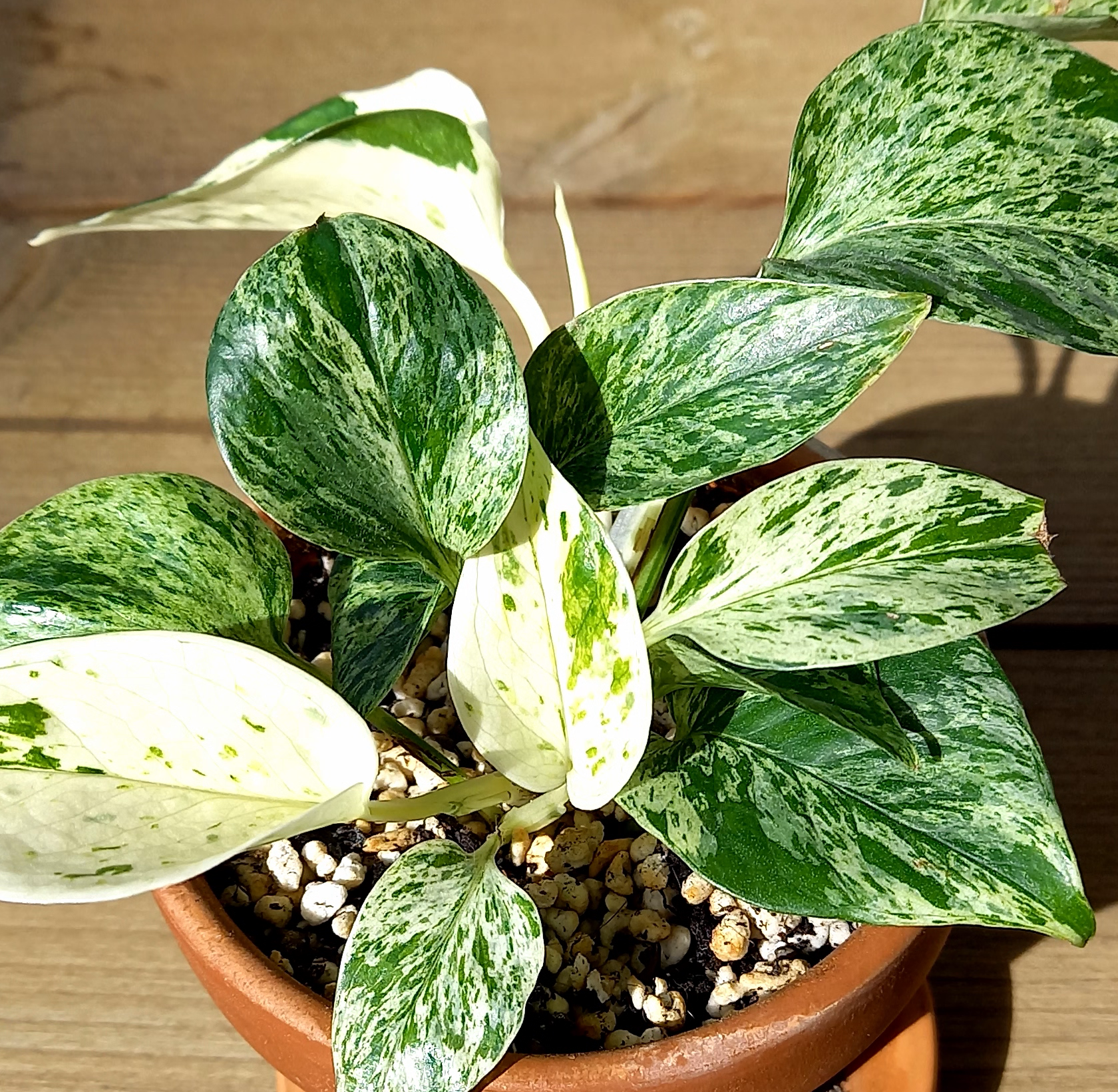
'Marble Queen'

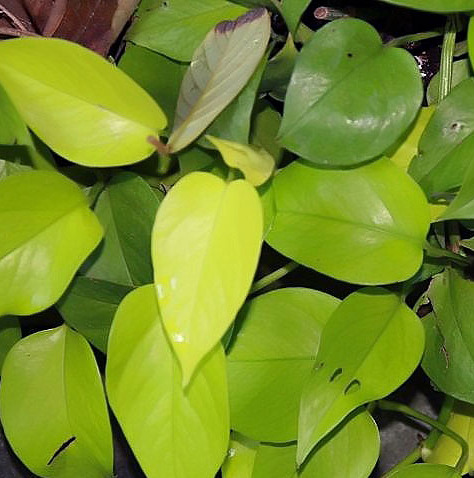
'Neon'

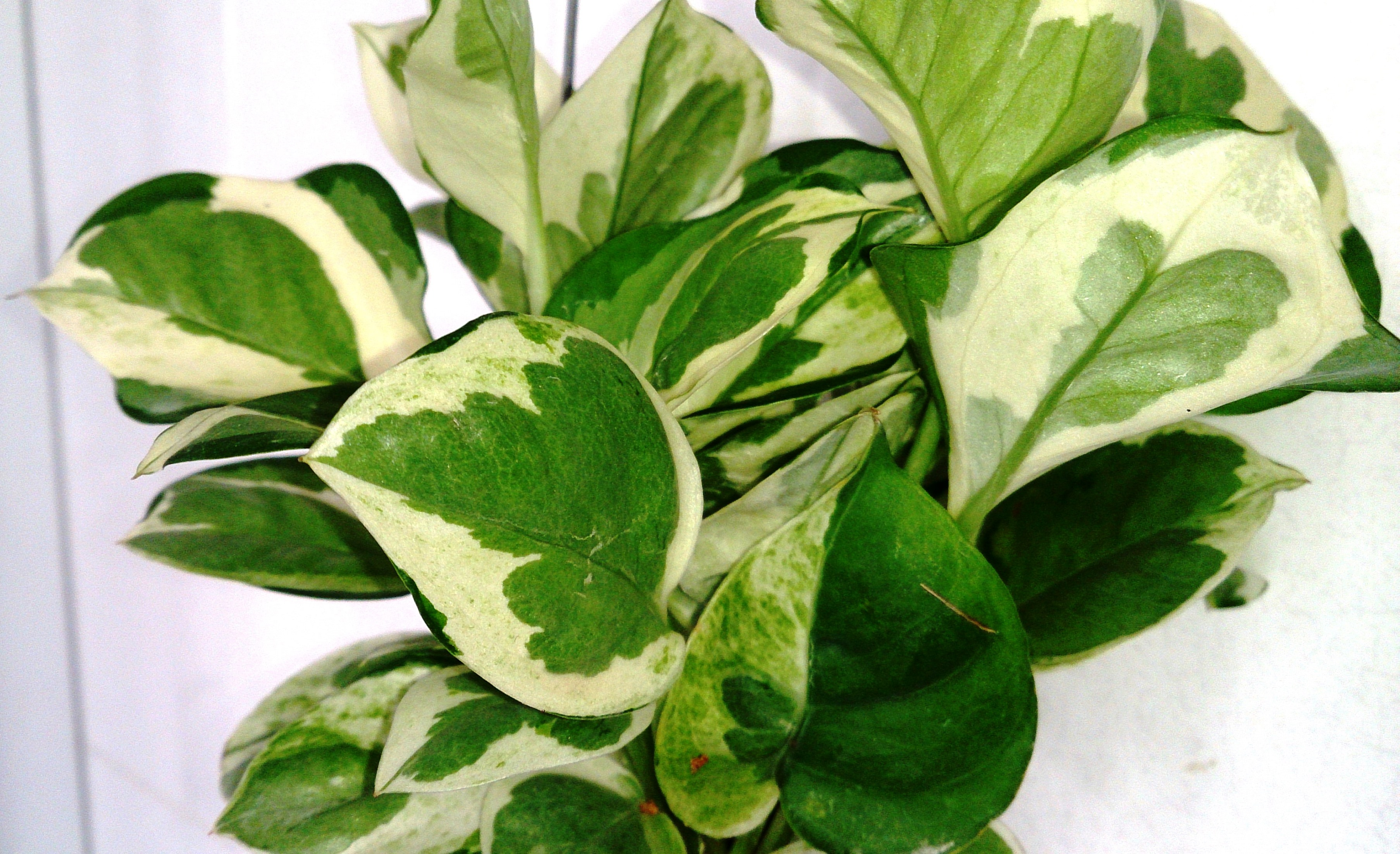
'Njoy'

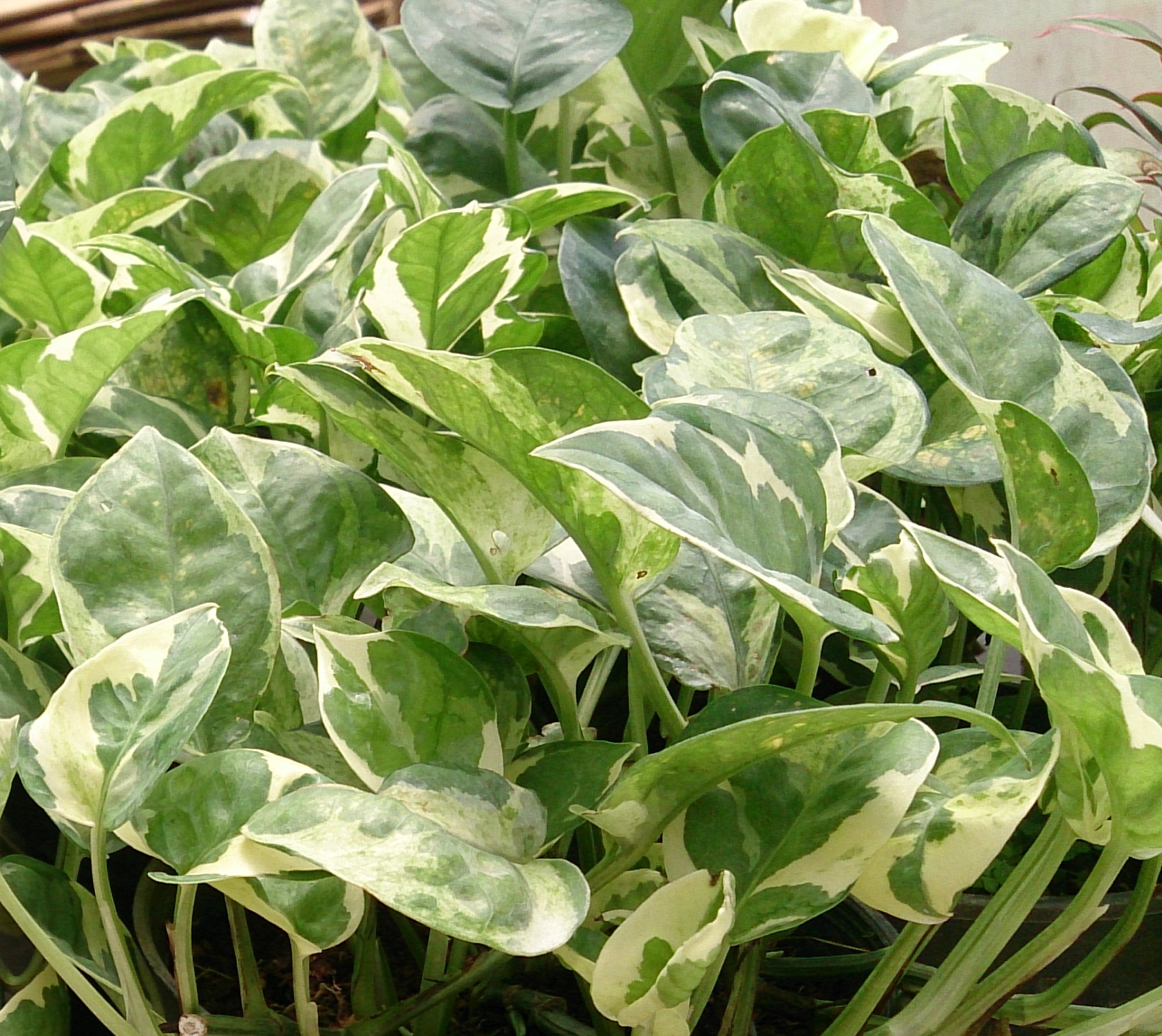
'Pearls and Jade'

There are several cultivars known in the houseplant community. Common varieties include 'Global Green', 'Golden', 'Jade', 'Jessenia', 'Manjula', 'Marble Queen', 'Neon', 'Njoy', 'Pearls and Jade', and 'Shangri-La'. The Global Green and Jessenia varieties have green leaves with green to yellow variegation. The Jade variety has solid green leaves. The Manjula variety has leaves with dark green margins with cream-colored centers. The Marble Queen variety has green leaves with white marbling. The Neon variety has a bright yellow to chartreuse color. It prefers bright light. The Njoy variety has smaller leaves and variegation. It is relatively slower to grow than other varieties of pathos. The Pearls and Jade variety has small green dots. The Shangri-La variety has crinkled and curled leaves. It is also known as the "sleeping pothos" or "spinach" pothos.

== Toxicity ==
The plant is listed as toxic to cats and dogs by the ASPCA, because of the presence of insoluble raphides. Care should be taken to ensure the plant is not consumed by pets. Symptoms may include oral irritation, vomiting, and difficulty in swallowing.

Due to the calcium oxalate within the plant, it can be mildly toxic to humans as well. Possible side effects from the consumption of E. aureum are atopic dermatitis (eczema) as well as burning and/or swelling of the region inside of and surrounding the mouth. Excessive contact with the plant can also lead to general skin irritation or contact dermatitis.

== Invasive species ==
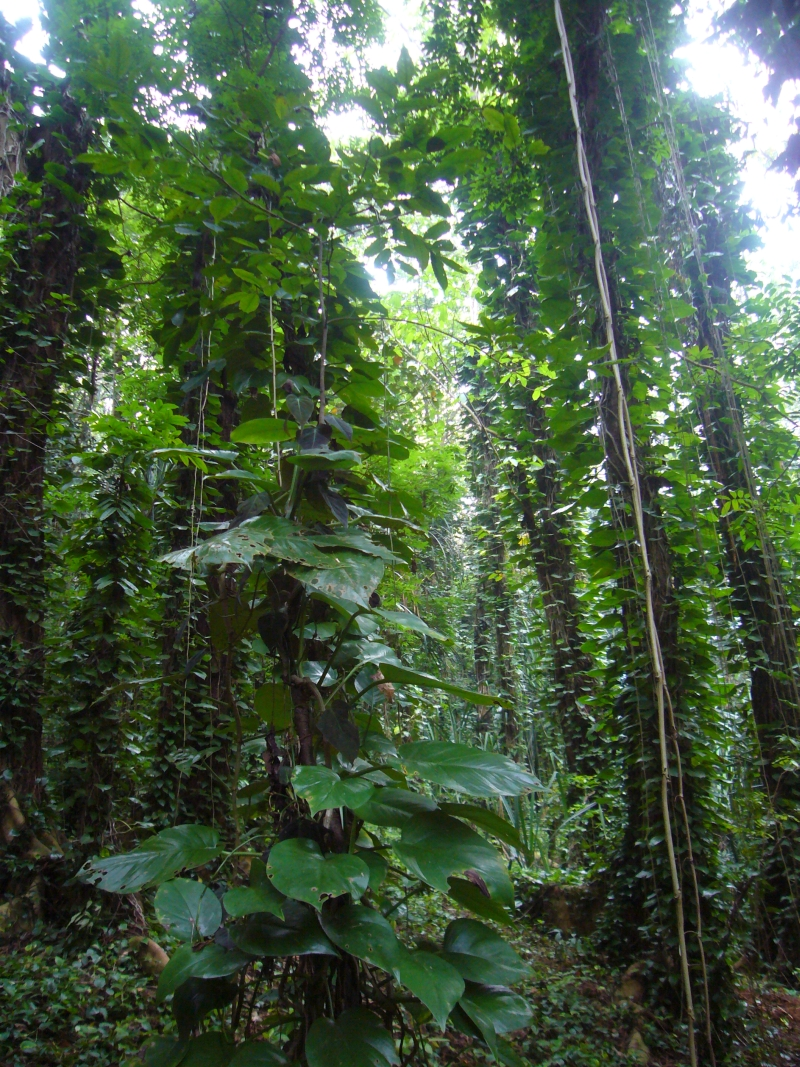
Overgrowing Udawattakele Forest in Sri Lanka

Epipremnum aureum can become a highly invasive species when introduced into tropical countries where it is not native. In Sri Lanka, it overgrows several hectares of the Udawatta Kele Sanctuary in Kandy. Having no natural enemies, it completely overgrows the forest floor as well as the trunks of trees, causing severe ecological disruption. It has also invaded the Kurulukele Forest Reserve in Kegalla, Sri Lanka, and other places where it has been planted as a decorative plant, or to hold steep banks along roads. It was included in the Florida Exotic Pest Control Council's 1999 list of invasive species.

A study published in the South African Journal of Botany found the species to be a potential risk of becoming an invasive species along the coasts of South Africa. It suggested a number of different ways to prevent the spreading of the species in the wild, one of which included barring the cultivation of the species outside of a supervised area. Additionally, however, the study pointed out that E. aureum cannot propagate on a large scale due to its lack of seed banks as well as its minimal immunity to herbicides. If the plant is maintained in a controlled area, it is not as significant a threat as when it grows freely in the wild.

== In popular culture ==
- The 2023 short horror-comedy film Brenda and Billy (and the Pothos Plant), written and directed by Dave Solomon, features two estranged siblings, a botanist and a magician, attempting to resurrect their mother. The film premiered at the Tribeca Festival. Solomon described the film as a cautionary tale about overwatering a pothos plant.
- A golden pothos features in the 2024 children's picture book Mamá's Magnificent Dancing Plantitas, written by Jesús Trejo and illustrated by Eliza Kinkz. In the story, a boy attempts to cheer up his mother's favorite houseplant, a golden pothos, by organizing a dance party, accidentally knocking over its pot.
- The 1976 electronic album Mother Earth's Plantasia by composer Mort Garson includes a piece titled "Concerto for Philodendron and Pothos". The album consists of synthesizer compositions inspired by houseplants and was reissued in 2019.

== Gallery ==
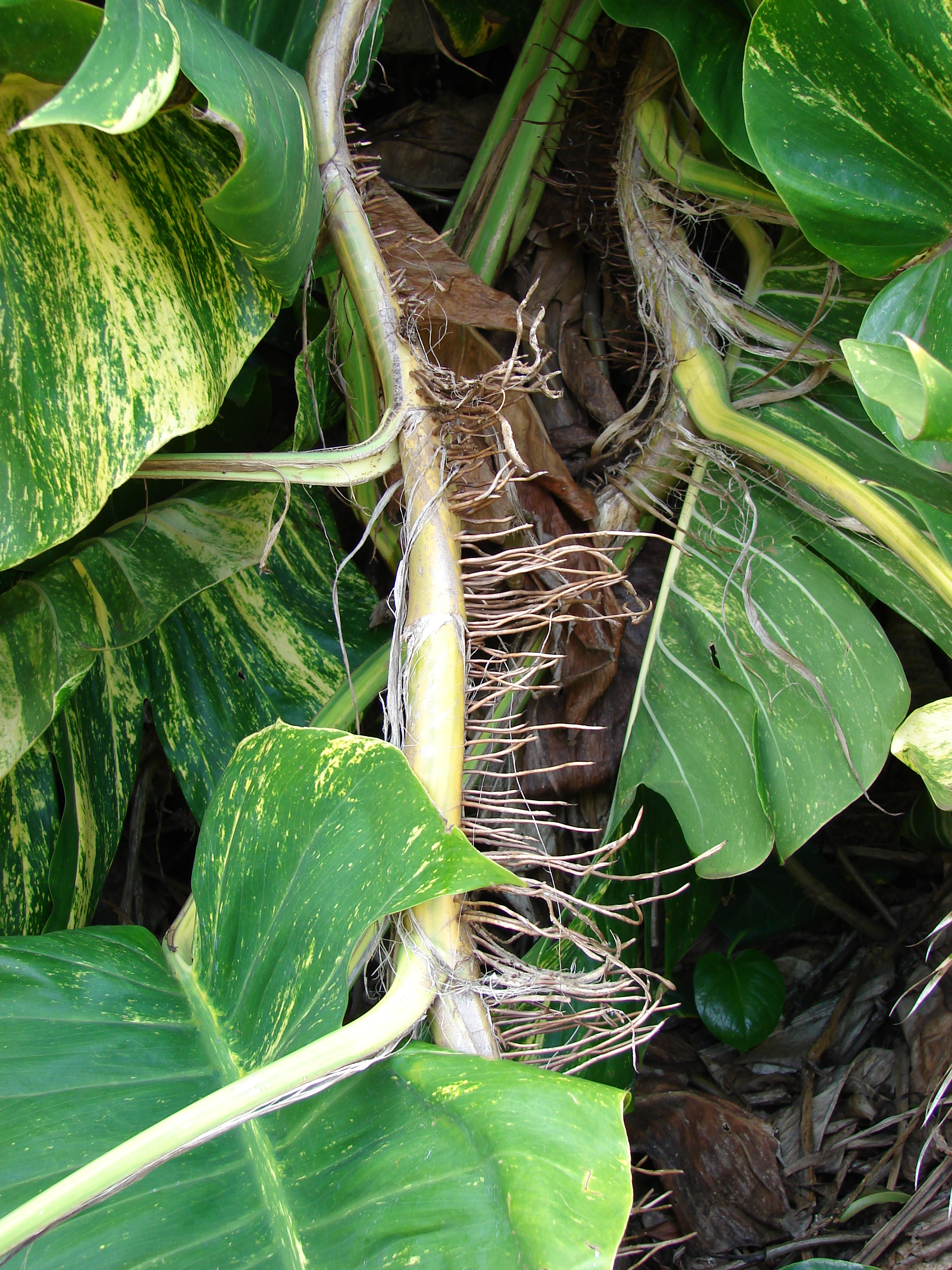
Foliage and stems adults

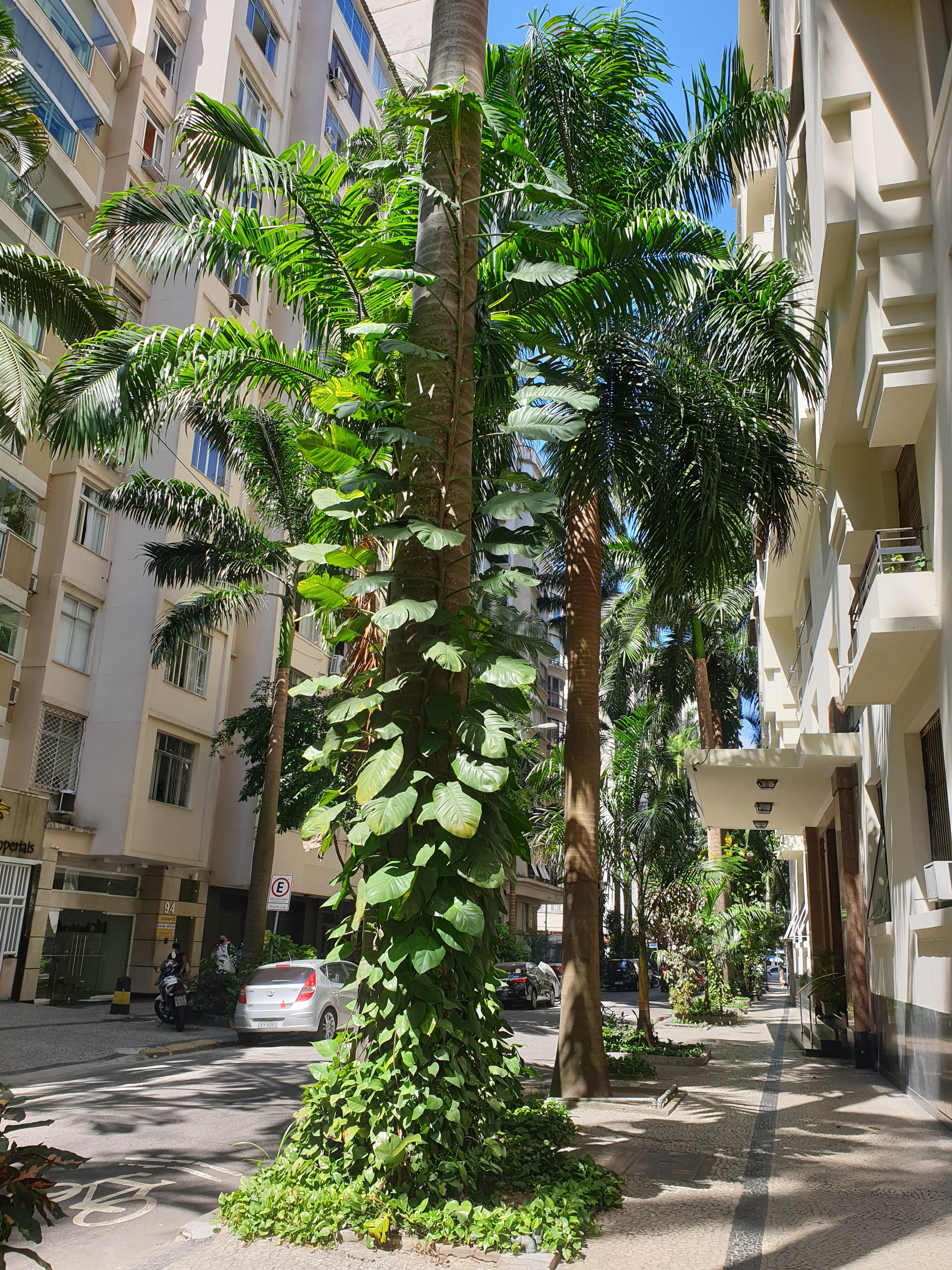
Climbing a Roystonea oleracea

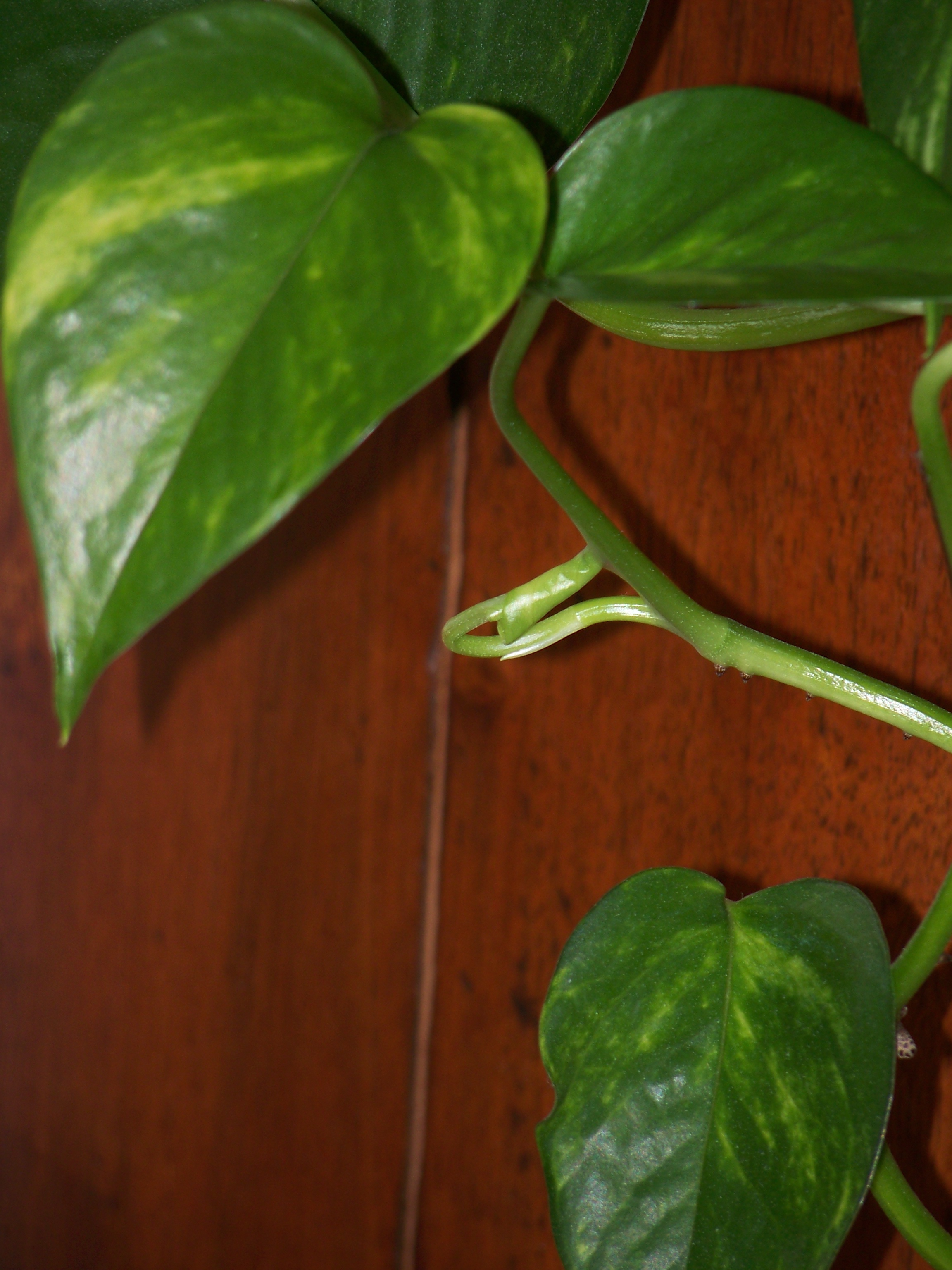
Young leaf growth

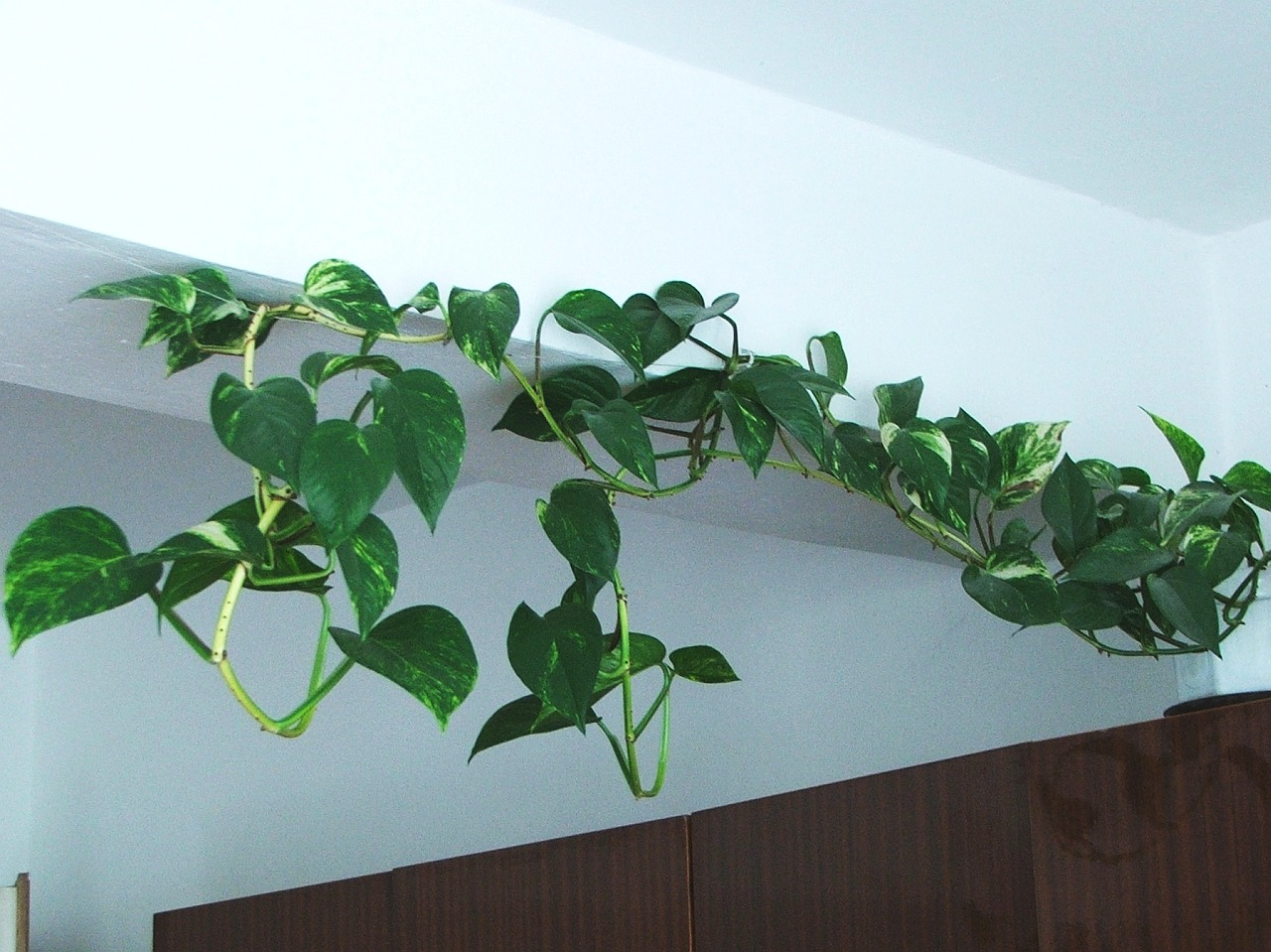
Trailing on a wall
