= Epipremnum papuanum =

Scientific classification
- Kingdom: Plantae
- Clade: Embryophytes
- Clade: Tracheophytes
- Clade: Spermatophytes
- Clade: Angiosperms
- Clade: Monocots
- Order: Alismatales
- Family: Araceae
- Genus: Epipremnum
- Species: E. papuanum

Binomial name
- Epipremnum papuanum Alderw.

Species of plant

Epipremnum papuanum is a flowering plant belonging to the genus Epipremnum, and the family Araceae. It exhibits liana growth style.

== Distribution ==
It is native to the isle of New Guinea.

== Description ==
It is an evergreen perennial vine, which climbs structures like trees with the help of aerial roots, with simple or pinnate leaves (see glossary of leaf morphology) and flowers within green spathes, but these flowers are not normally seen in cultivated plants as they simply do not have the right conditions for growth.
