= Epipremnum meeboldii =

Scientific classification
- Kingdom: Plantae
- Clade: Tracheophytes
- Clade: Angiosperms
- Clade: Monocots
- Order: Alismatales
- Family: Araceae
- Genus: Epipremnum
- Species: E. meeboldii

Binomial name
- Epipremnum meeboldii K.Krause

Species of flowering plant

Epipremnum meeboldii is a species of flowering plant in the genus Epipremnum and the family Araceae. It is native to the Indian state of Assam (Manipur).
