= Epipremnum moszkowskii =

Scientific classification
- Kingdom: Plantae
- Clade: Tracheophytes
- Clade: Angiosperms
- Clade: Monocots
- Order: Alismatales
- Family: Araceae
- Genus: Epipremnum
- Species: E. moszkowskii

Binomial name
- Epipremnum moszkowskii K.Krause

Species of plant

Epipremnum moszkowskii is a species of flowering plant of the genus Epipremnum, belonging to the family Araceae. It is a woody vine endemic to the tropical rainforest in the western part of the island of New Guinea (West New Guinea).

== Distribution ==
This species is only distributed in the western part of the island of New Guinea, including the provinces of Papua and West Papua in Indonesia, where it is endemic.
