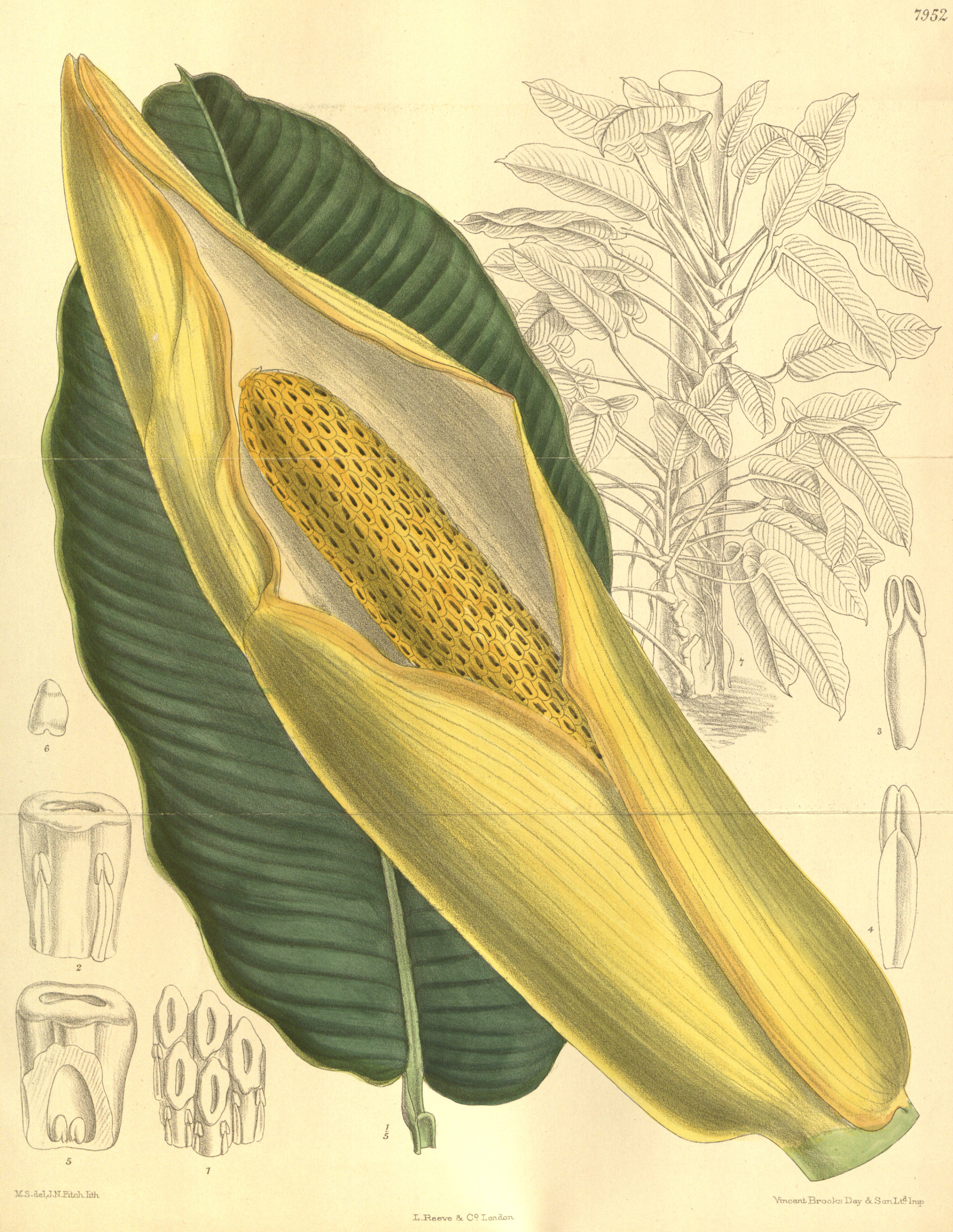

Scientific classification
- Kingdom: Plantae
- Clade: Tracheophytes
- Clade: Angiosperms
- Clade: Monocots
- Order: Alismatales
- Family: Araceae
- Genus: Epipremnum
- Species: E. giganteum

Binomial name
- Epipremnum giganteum (Roxb.) Schott

Synonyms
- Monstera gigantea (Roxb.) Schott; Pothos giganteus Roxb.; Rhaphidophora gigantea (Roxb.) Ridl.; Scindapsus giganteus (Roxb.) Schott

= Epipremnum giganteum =

Species of plant

Epipremnum giganteum is a species of flowering plant in the genus Epipremnum.

== Description ==
It is known for its large stems and leaves. The stems can grow up to 10–35 mm (0.39–1.38 in) in diameter and its leaves are 30–91 cm (12–36 in) long and 15–23 cm (5.9–9.1 in) wide. Leaves are characterized by leathery texture, oblong leaves, and prominent striate venation. The plant is known to flower regularly compared to other Epipremnum species; inflorescences are deep golden yellow and solitary.

== Native distribution ==
It is native to Myanmar, Cambodia, Vietnam, Thailand, peninsular Malaysia, and Singapore.

== Gallery ==
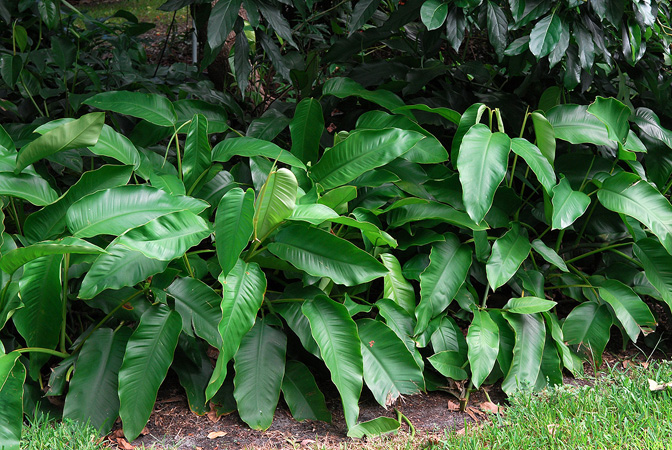
Epipremnum giganteum in its native range
