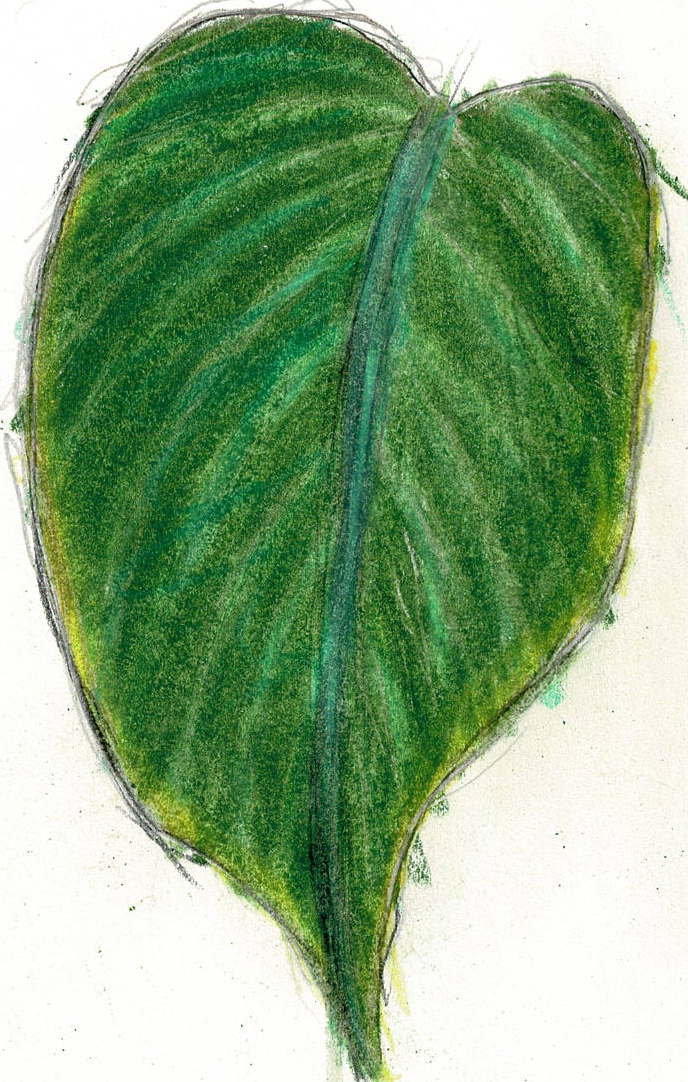
- Drawing of the leaf of the plant

Scientific classification
- Kingdom: Plantae
- Clade: Tracheophytes
- Clade: Angiosperms
- Clade: Monocots
- Order: Alismatales
- Family: Araceae
- Genus: Epipremnum
- Species: E. carolinense

Binomial name
- Epipremnum carolinense Volkens

Synonyms
- Epipremnum koidzumii Kaneh. Epipremnum carolinensis (Volkens) Fosberg; Epipremnum palauense Koidz.

= Epipremnum carolinense =

Species of plant

Epipremnum carolinense is a flowering plant. Epipremnum carolinense belongs to the genus Epipremnum, and family Araceae.

This species' native range is the Caroline Islands, part of Micronesia and Palau.
