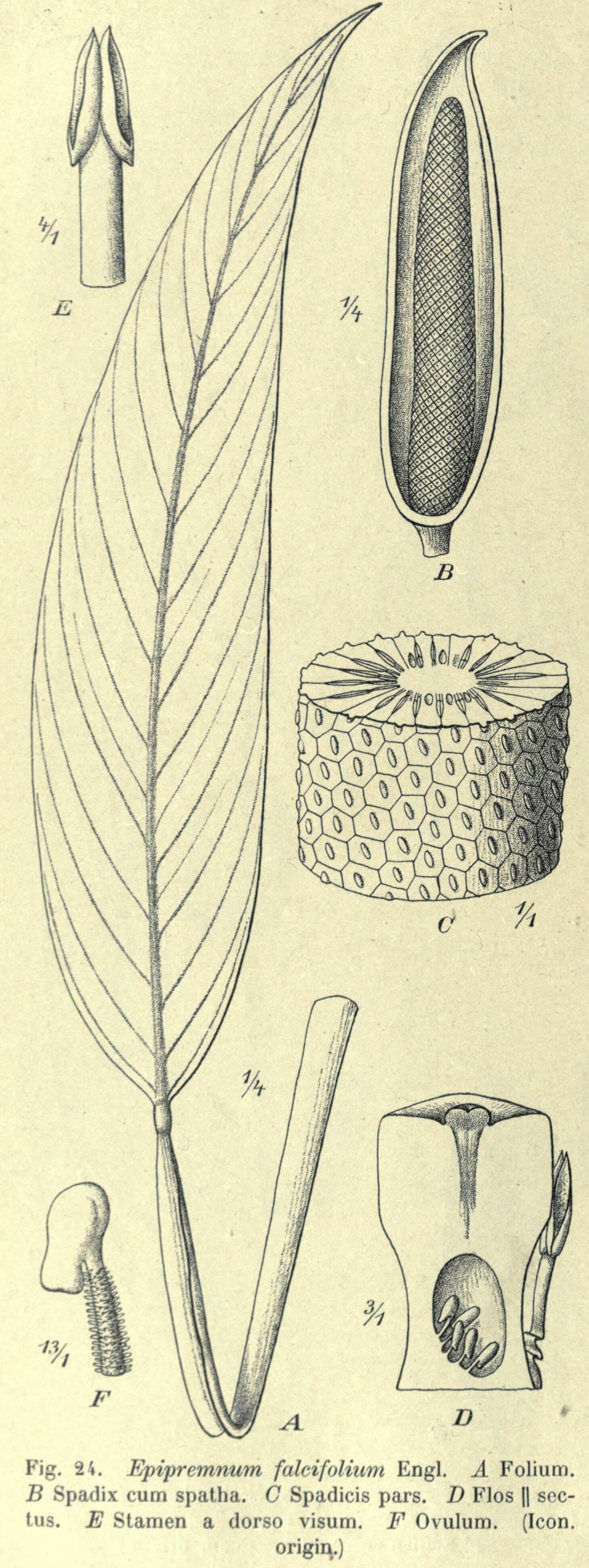

Scientific classification
- Kingdom: Plantae
- Clade: Tracheophytes
- Clade: Angiosperms
- Clade: Monocots
- Order: Alismatales
- Family: Araceae
- Genus: Epipremnum
- Species: E. falcifolium

Binomial name
- Epipremnum falcifolium Engl.

= Epipremnum falcifolium =

Species of plant

Epipremnum falcifolium is a flowering plant in the genus Epipremnum. It is native to Borneo.
