= Epipremnum obtusum =

Scientific classification
- Kingdom: Plantae
- Clade: Tracheophytes
- Clade: Angiosperms
- Clade: Monocots
- Order: Alismatales
- Family: Araceae
- Genus: Epipremnum
- Species: E. obtusum

Binomial name
- Epipremnum obtusum Engl. & K.Krause

Species of flowering plant

Epipremnum obtusum is a species of flowering plant belonging to the genus Epipremnum and the family Araceae. It was first described by Adolf Engler and Kurt Krause.

== Distribution and habitat ==
The plant occurs in New Guinea.
