= Epipremnum moluccanum =

Scientific classification
- Kingdom: Plantae
- Clade: Tracheophytes
- Clade: Angiosperms
- Clade: Monocots
- Order: Alismatales
- Family: Araceae
- Genus: Epipremnum
- Species: E. moluccanum

Binomial name
- Epipremnum moluccanum Schott, 1863

Species of flowering plant

Epipremnum moluccanum is a species of flowering plant belonging to the genus Epipremnum and the family Araceae.

== Distribution and habitat ==
It is native to the Maluku Islands.
