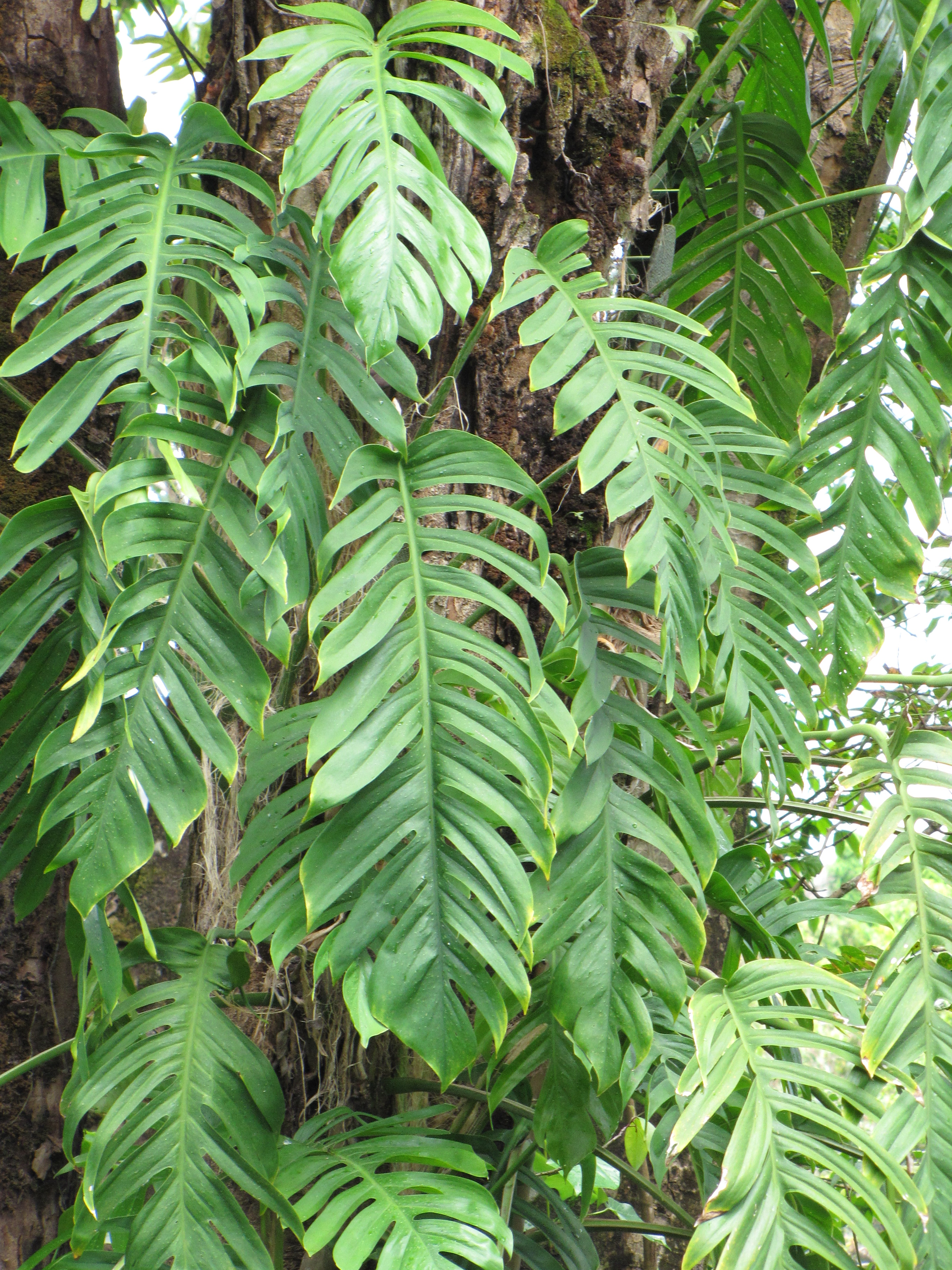
- Epipremnum pinnatum

Scientific classification
- Kingdom: Plantae
- Clade: Tracheophytes
- Clade: Angiosperms
- Clade: Monocots
- Order: Alismatales
- Family: Araceae
- Subfamily: Monsteroideae
- Tribe: Monstereae
- Genus: Epipremnum; Schott

Synonyms
- Anthelia Schott 1863, illegitimate homonym, not Dumort. 1835

= Epipremnum =

Genus of flowering plants

Epipremnum is a genus of flowering plants in the family Araceae, found in tropical forests from China, the Himalayas, and Southeast Asia to Australia the western Pacific. They are evergreen perennial vines climbing with the aid of aerial roots. They may be confused with other Monstereae such as Rhaphidophora, Scindapsus and Amydrium.

All parts of the plants are toxic, mostly due to trichosclereids (long sharp cells) and raphides. Plants can grow to over 40 m (131 ft) with leaves up to 3 m (10 ft) long, but in containers the size is much reduced. The plants, commonly known as centipede tongavine, pothos or devil's ivy, depending on species, are typically grown as houseplants in temperate regions. Juvenile leaves are bright green, often with irregularly variegated patterns of yellow or white. They may find host trees by the use of skototropism.

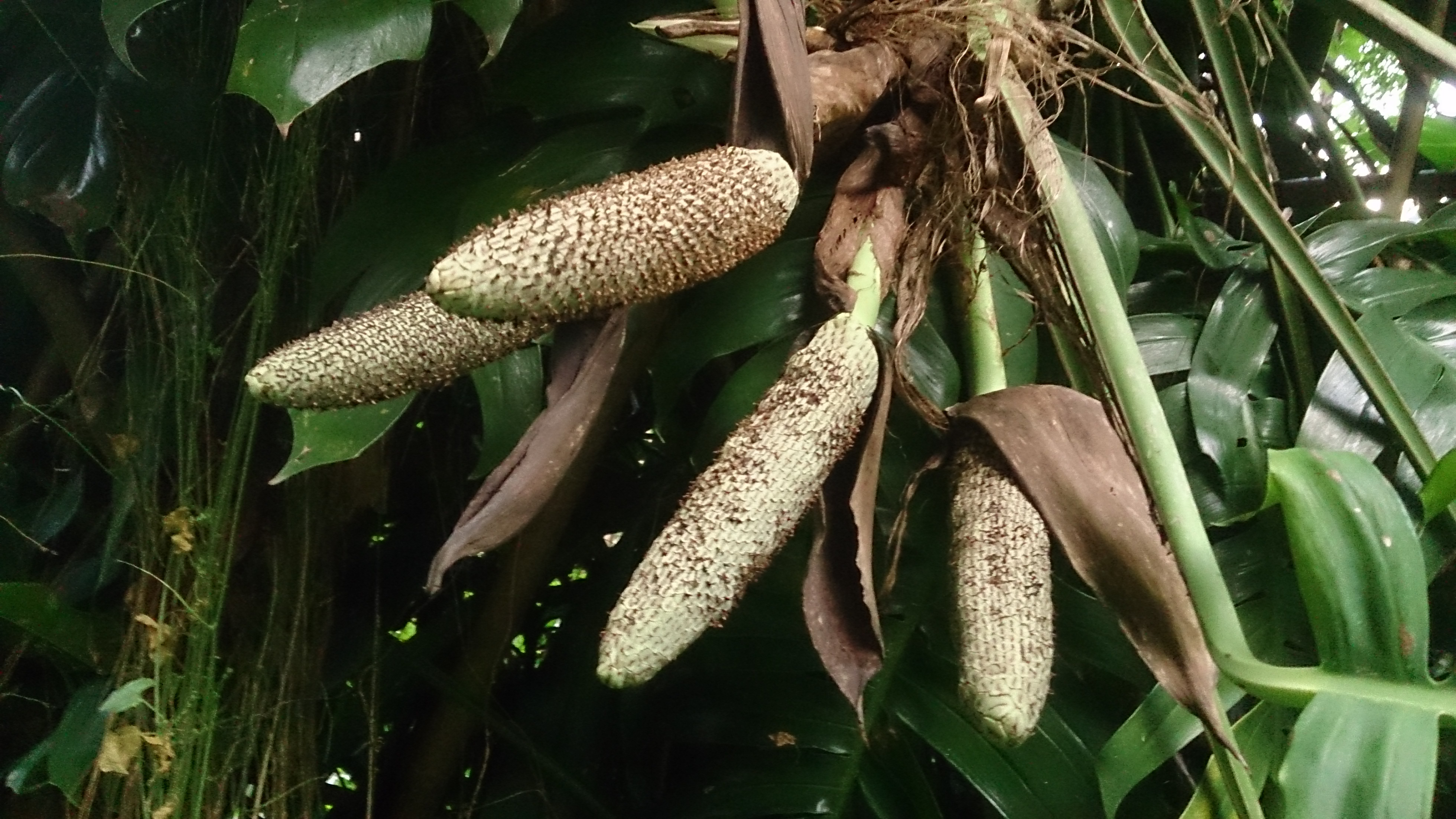
Spadix of Epipremnum pinnatum

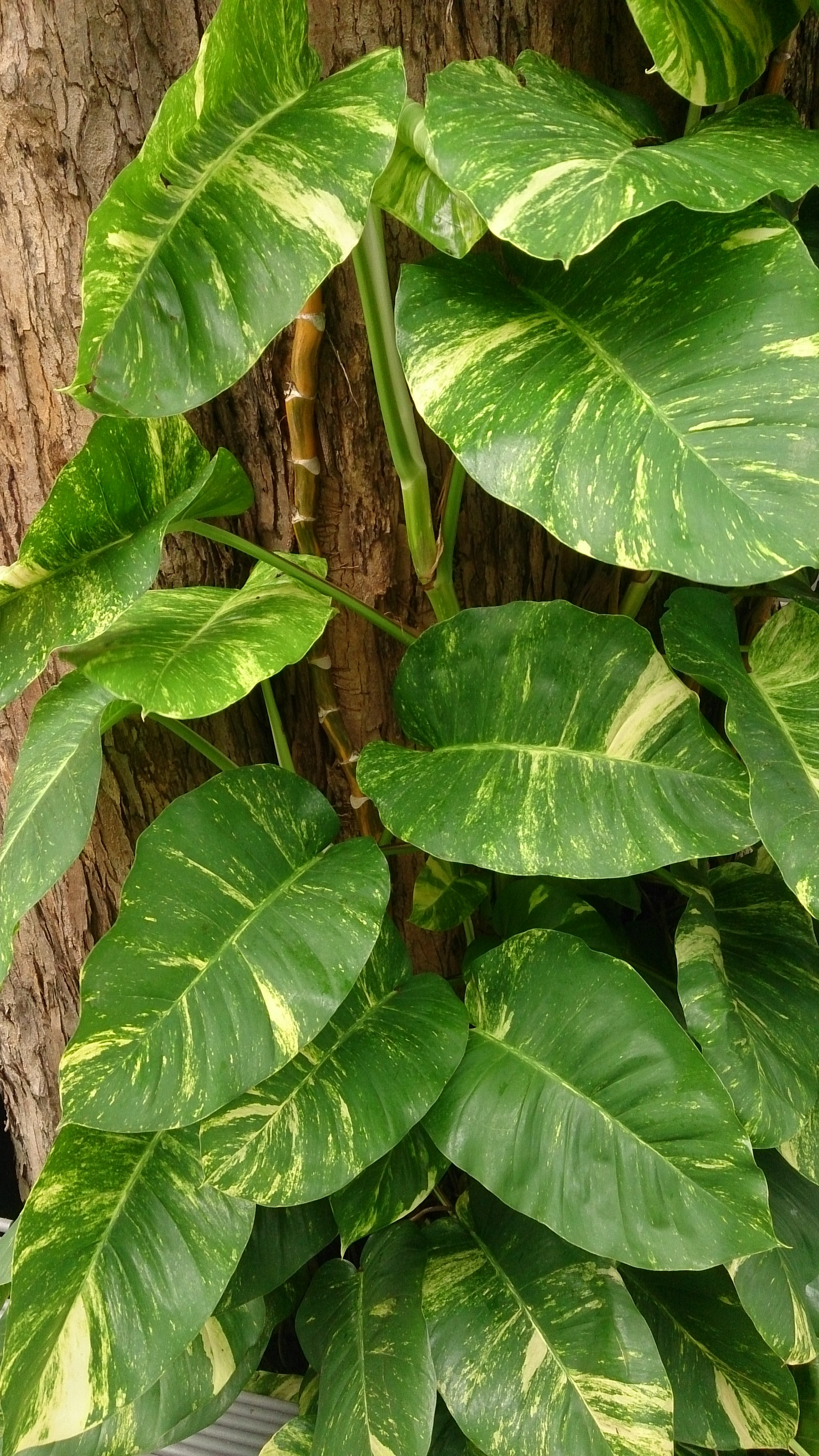
Epipremnum aureum

== Etymology ==
From the Greek ἐπί (upon) and πρέμνον (stump).

== Species ==
- Epipremnum amplissimum (Schott) Engl. - Queensland, New Guinea, Solomon Islands, Bismarck Archipelago, Vanuatu
- Epipremnum aureum (Linden & André) G.S.Bunting - native to Moorea in Polynesia; naturalized in Africa, the Indian Subcontinent, Queensland, Melanesia, Seychelles, Hawaii, Florida, Costa Rica, Bermuda, the West Indies, Brazil, and Ecuador
- Epipremnum carolinense Volkens - Micronesia
- Epipremnum ceramense (Engl. & K.Krause) Alderw. - Maluku
- Epipremnum dahlii Engl. - Bismarck Archipelago
- Epipremnum falcifolium Engl. - Borneo
- Epipremnum giganteum (Roxb.) Schott - Indochina (Syn. Monstera gigantea (Roxb.) Schot)
- Epipremnum meeboldii K.Krause - Manipur region of India
- Epipremnum moluccanum Schott - Maluku
- Epipremnum moszkowskii K.Krause - western New Guinea
- Epipremnum nobile (Schott) Engl. - Sulawesi
- Epipremnum obtusum Engl. & K.Krause - Papua New Guinea
- Epipremnum papuanum Alderw. - Papua New Guinea
- Epipremnum pinnatum (L.) Engl. - widespread across Southeast Asia, southern China, New Guinea, Melanesia, northern Australia; naturalized in West Indies
- Epipremnum silvaticum Alderw. Sumatra

== Fossil record ==
Three fossil seeds of †Epipremnum crassum have been described from middle Miocene strata of the Fasterholt area near Silkeborg in Central Jutland, Denmark. Fossils of this species have also been reported from the Oligocene and Miocene of Western Siberia and the Miocene and Pliocene of Europe.

== Bibliography ==
- Strong, Donald R.; Ray, Thomas S. (1 January 1975). "Host Tree Location Behavior of a Tropical Vine (Monstera gigantea) by Skototropism". Science. 190 (4216): 804–806. Bibcode:1975Sci...190..804S. doi:10.1126/science.190.4216.804. JSTOR 1741614. S2CID 84386403.
