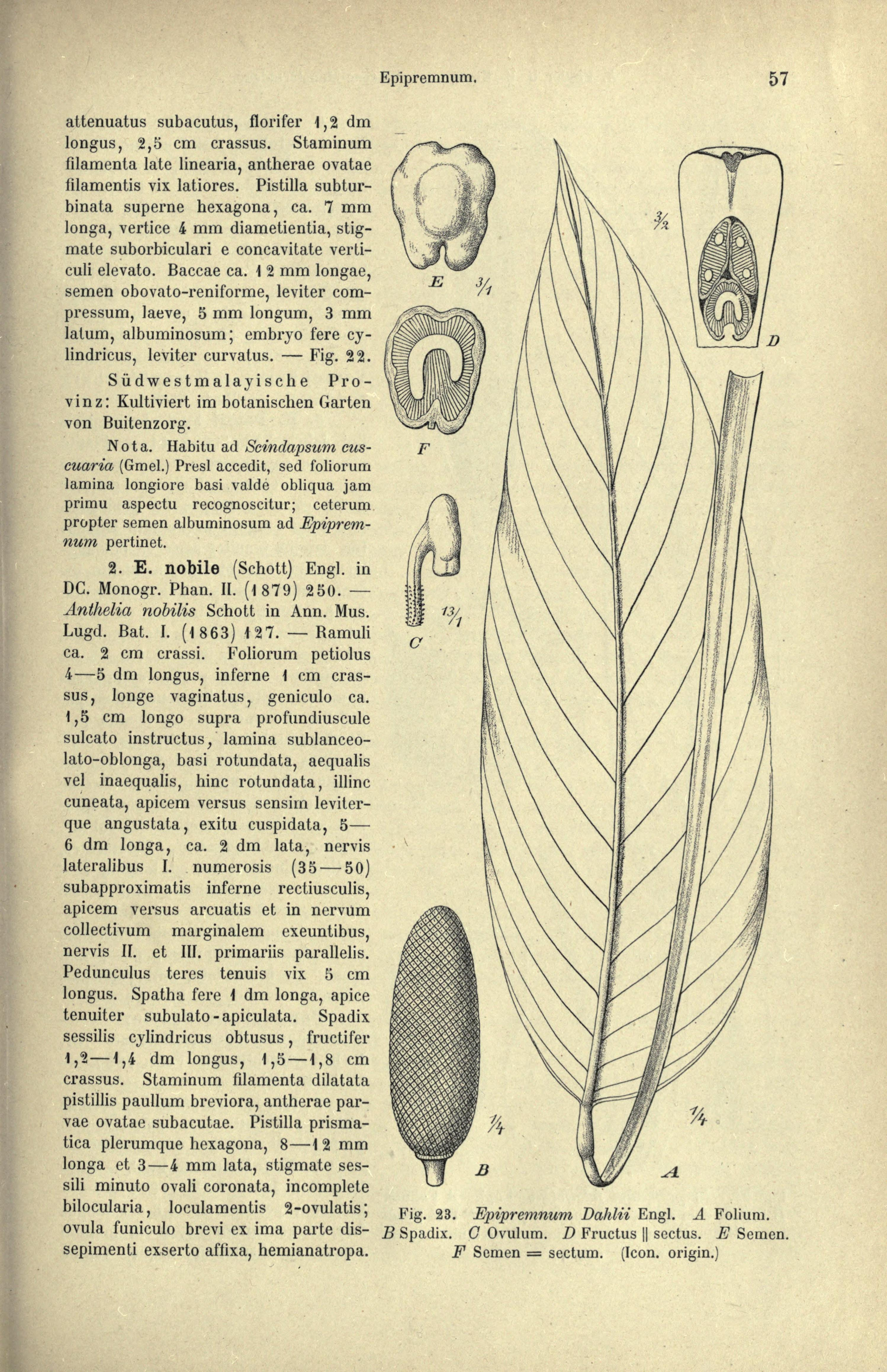

Scientific classification
- Kingdom: Plantae
- Clade: Tracheophytes
- Clade: Angiosperms
- Clade: Monocots
- Order: Alismatales
- Family: Araceae
- Genus: Epipremnum
- Species: E. dahlii

Binomial name
- Epipremnum dahlii Engl.

= Epipremnum dahlii =

Species of flowering plant

Epipremnum dahlii is a flowering plant belonging to the genus Epipremnum and family Araceae.

it is native to the Bismarck archipelago.
