= Epipremnum nobile =

Scientific classification
- Kingdom: Plantae
- Clade: Tracheophytes
- Clade: Angiosperms
- Clade: Monocots
- Order: Alismatales
- Family: Araceae
- Genus: Epipremnum
- Species: E. nobile

Binomial name
- Epipremnum nobile (Schott) Engl.

Synonyms
- Epipremnum nobilis Schott

Species of plant

Epipremnum nobile is a species of flowering plant belonging to the genus Epipremnum and the family Araceae.

== Distribution and habitat ==
It can be found on the islands Sulawesi and New Britain.
