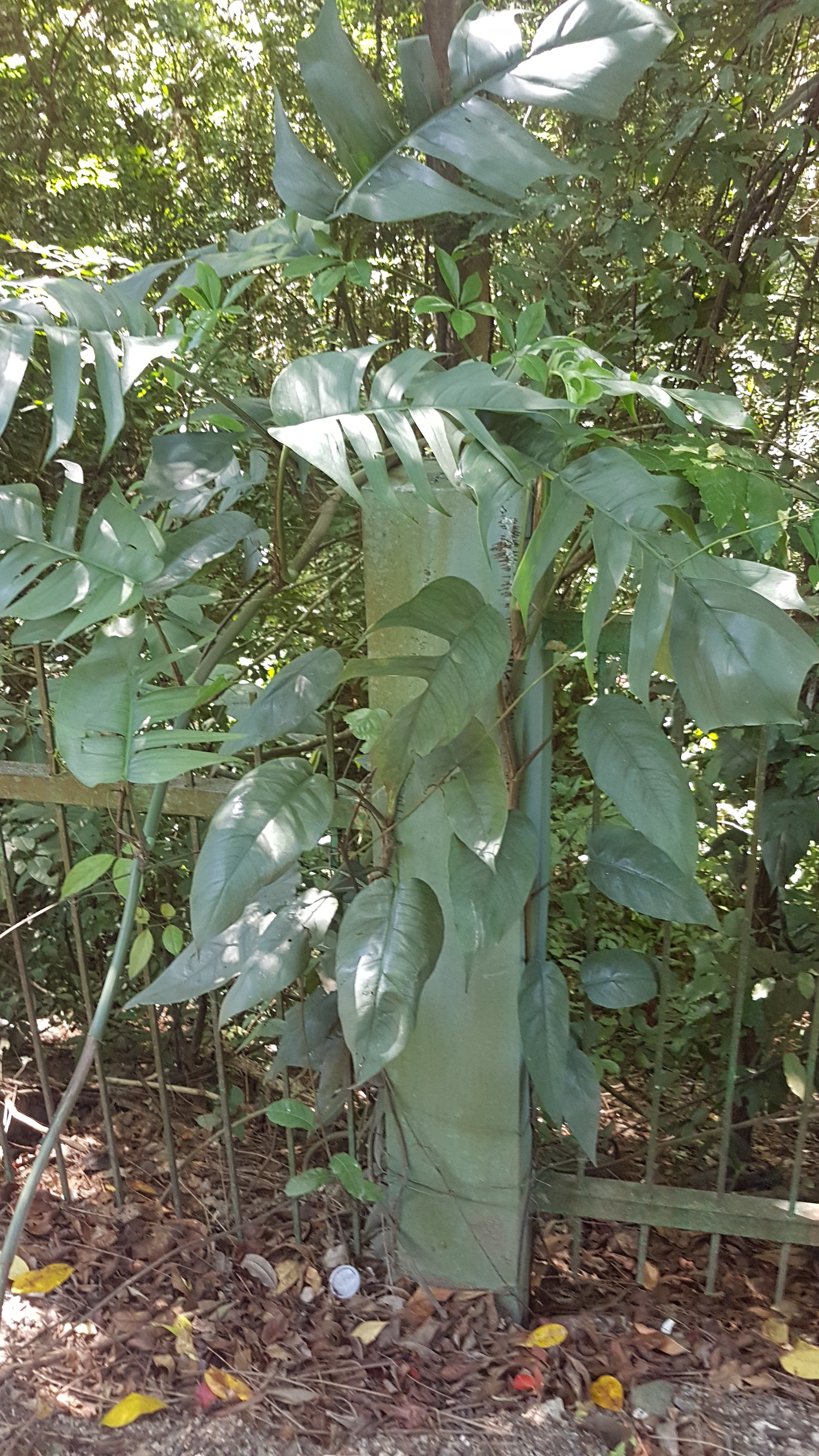
- Wild Epipremnum pinnatum in the Philippines showing both pinnately-divided mature leaves and entire young leaves

Scientific classification
- Kingdom: Plantae
- Clade: Tracheophytes
- Clade: Angiosperms
- Clade: Monocots
- Order: Alismatales
- Family: Araceae
- Genus: Epipremnum
- Species: E. pinnatum

Binomial name
- Epipremnum pinnatum (L.) Engl., 1908

Synonyms
- Numerous: Epipremnum angustilobum K.Krause, 1911; Epipremnum elegans Engl., 1879; Epipremnum elegans f. ternatensis Alderw., 1922; Epipremnum formosanum Hayata, 1915; Epipremnum glaucicephalum Elmer, 1938 [invalid]; Epipremnum merrillii Engl. & K.Krause, 1908; Epipremnum mirabile Schott, 1858; Epipremnum mirabile f. eperforatum Engl., 1898; Epipremnum mirabile f. multisectum Engl., 1898; Epipremnum pinnatum f. multisectum (Engl.) Engl., 1908; Epipremnum robinsonii K.Krause, 1912; Monstera caudata (Roxb.) Schott, 1830; Monstera dilacerata (K.Koch & Sello) K.Koch, 1855; Monstera pinnata (L.) Schott, 1830; Philodendron dilaceratum Engl., 1879; Philodendron nechodomae Britton, 1926; Polypodium laciniatum Burm.f., 1768; Pothos caudatus Roxb., 1820; Pothos decursivus Wall., 1831 [Illegitimate]; Pothos pinnatifidus Roxb., 1820; Pothos pinnatus L., 1763; Rhaphidophora caudata (Roxb.) Schott, 1860; Rhaphidophora cunninghamii Schott, 1861; Rhaphidophora dilacerata (K.Koch & Sello) K.Koch, 1864; Rhaphidophora formosana (Hayata) M.Hotta, 1970 [Illegitimate]; Rhaphidophora laciniata (Burm.f.) Merr., 1921; Rhaphidophora lovellae F.M.Bailey, 1897; Rhaphidophora merrillii Engl., 1905; Rhaphidophora neocaledonica Guillaumin, 1937; Rhaphidophora pertusa var. vitiensis (Schott) Engl.; Rhaphidophora pinnata (L.) Schott, 1857; Rhaphidophora pinnatifida (Roxb.) Schott, 1857; Rhaphidophora vitiensis Schott, 1861; Rhaphidophora wallichii Schott, 1860; Scindapsus bipinnatifidus Teijsm. & Binn., 1866; Scindapsus caudatus (Roxb.) Schott, 1832; Scindapsus decursivus Moritzi, 1854 [Illegitimate]; Scindapsus dilaceratus K.Koch & Sello, 1853; Scindapsus forsteri Endl., 1836; Scindapsus pinnatifidus (Roxb.) Schott, 1832; Scindapsus pinnatus (L.) Schott, 1832; Tornelia dilacerata (K.Koch & Sello) Schott, 1860

= Epipremnum pinnatum =

Centipede tongavine

Species of flowering plant

Epipremnum pinnatum is a species of flowering plant in the family Araceae. It has many common names, including centipede tongavine, taro vine, silver vine and dragon-tail plant. In the Philippines, it is known in Tagalog as tibatib.

Epipremnum pinnatum starts life on the ground and climbs up trees in its natural forest environment, transitioning to an epiphytic lifestyle over time. It exhibits foliage dimorphism, where juvenile leaves look different from mature leaves of the same plant.

== Distribution ==
The plant has a broad native Old World distribution. Native range extends from Northern Australia through Malaysia and Indochina into southern China, Taiwan, Japan, and as far as Melanesia. The species has also become naturalised in the West Indies.

== Cultivation ==
The plant has been kept as a houseplant or garden plant for ornamental purposes. Its leaves possess an aesthetic value, and the plant can be hardy in most indoor conditions. In a flower pot, or at a smaller size, its growth is similar to many vining plants, following a drooping, creeping pattern. Aerial roots will dot the stem. Instead of letting the plant hang, some gardeners prefer to add a small lattice or climbing pole for the plant, which would allow it to climb into a more visually interesting shape.

In a pot, the plant needs water retaining, porous soil. Many commercially available houseplant or tropical garden soil mixes will suffice. The plant is not entirely drought resistant, and needs the soil it's rooted in to be watered weekly, or more frequently in a bigger pot. So long, as the soil is allowed to partially or fully dry a couple inches down between waterings. It helps to provide good drainage to the pot, as standing water can damage the plant's roots.

== Gallery ==
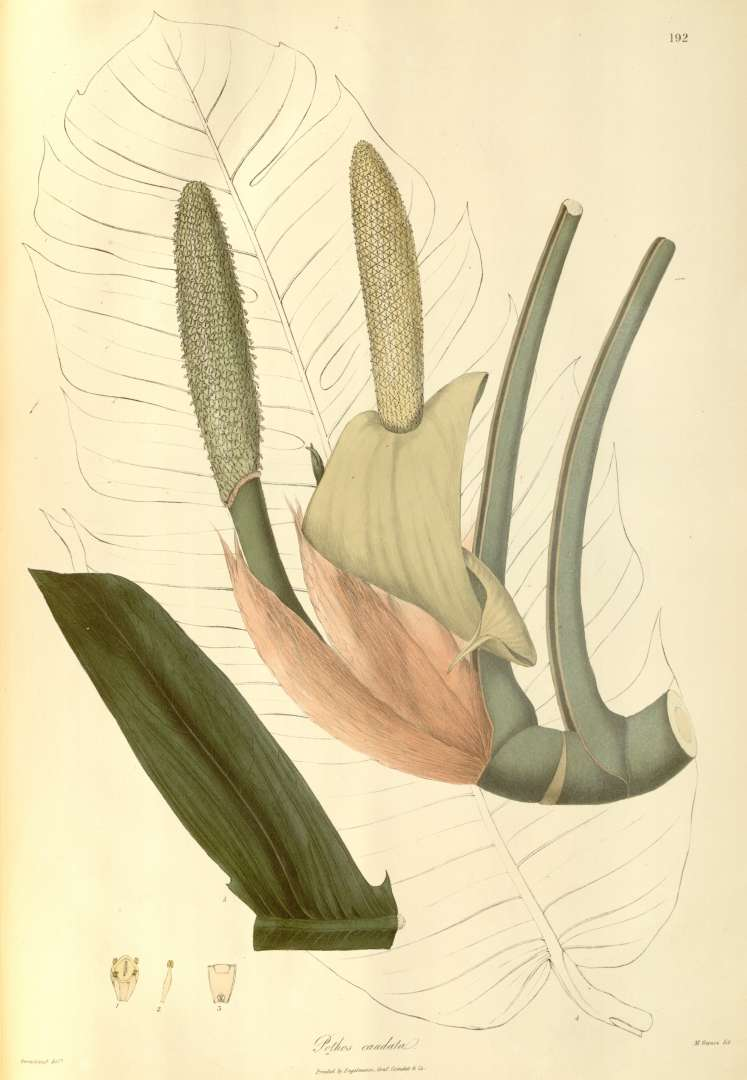
Illustration, Plantae Asiaticae Rariores, vol. 2: t. 192 (1831)

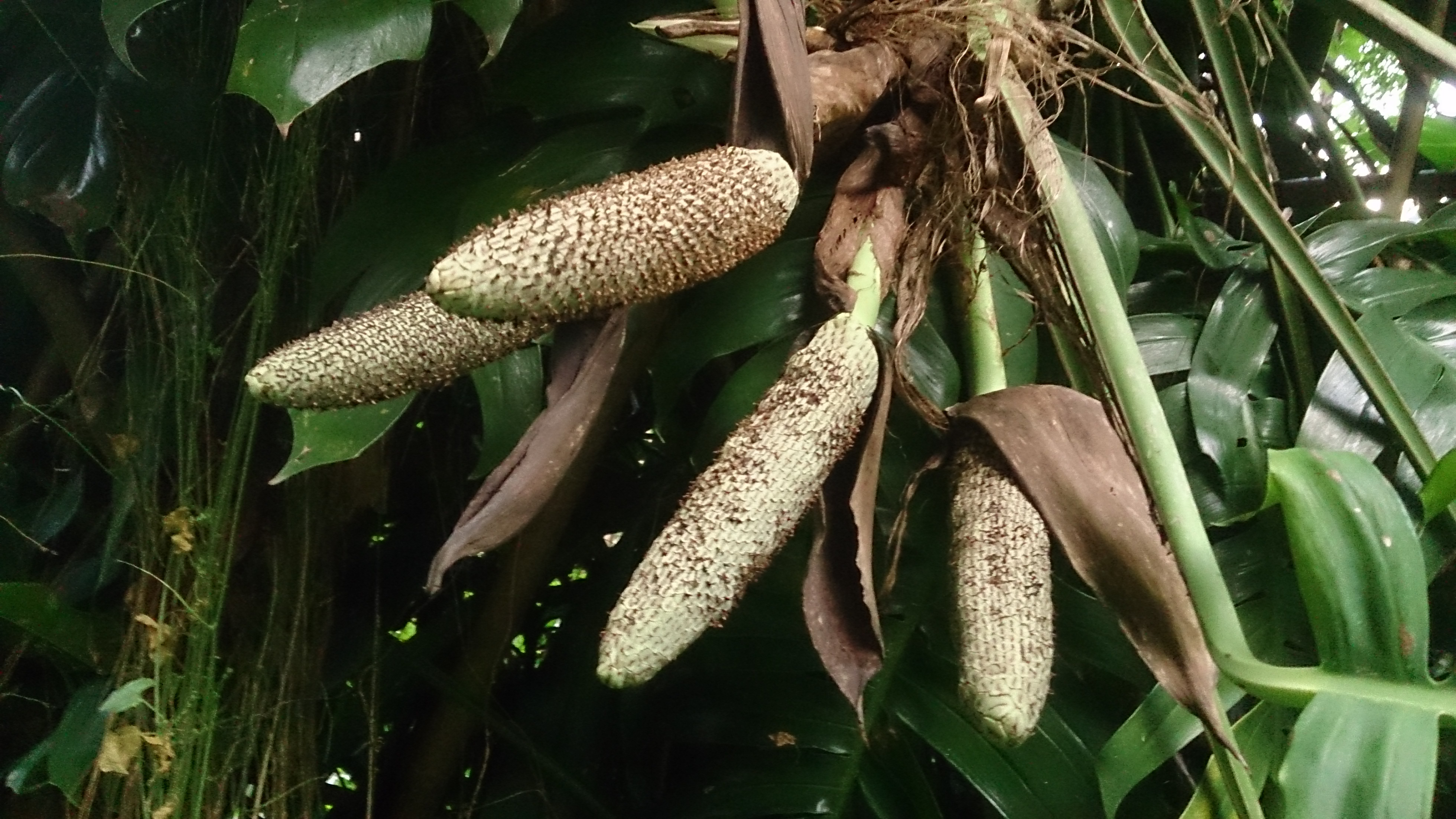
Spadix

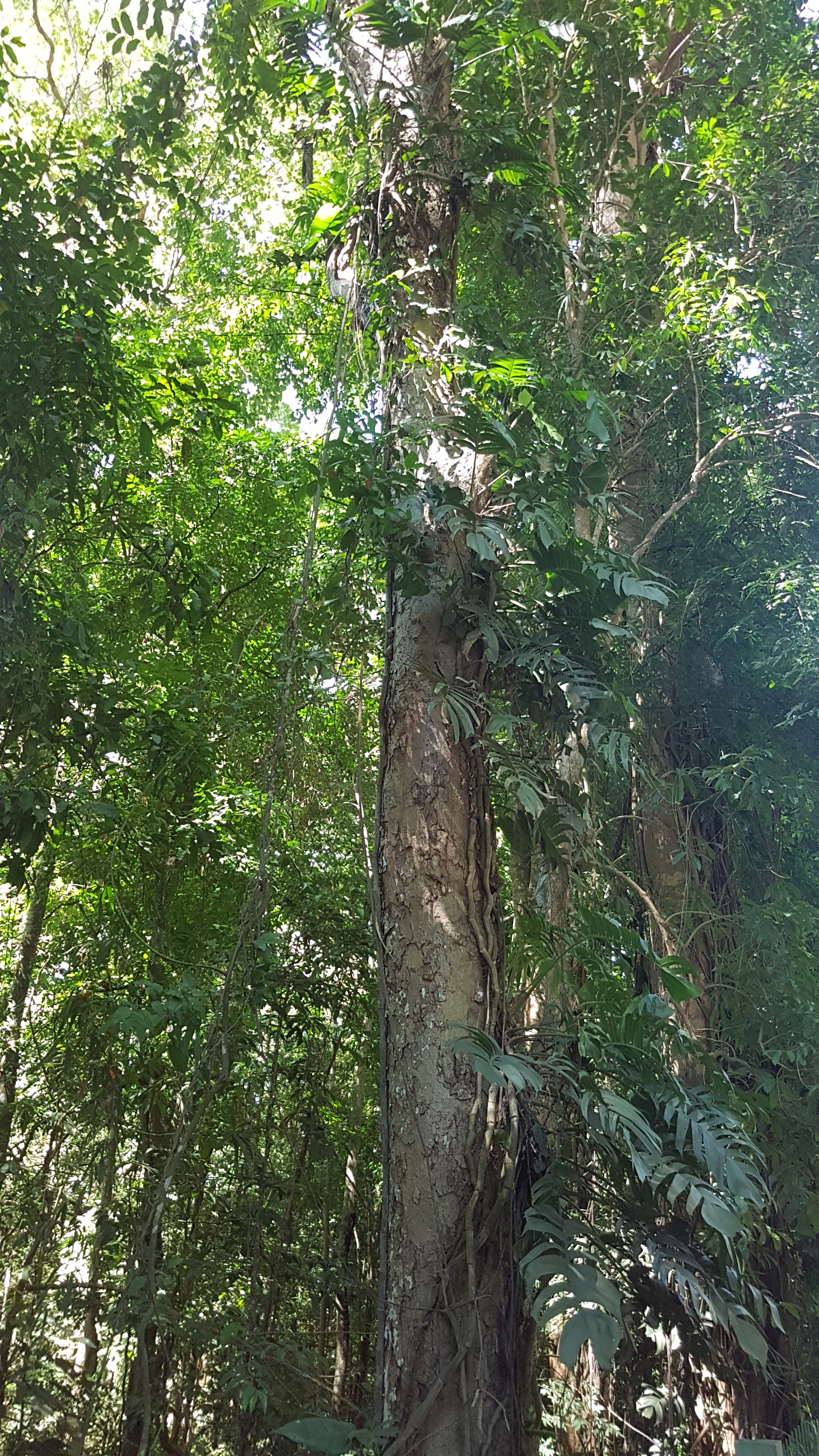
Wild Epipremnum pinnatum in the Philippines showing its liana habit

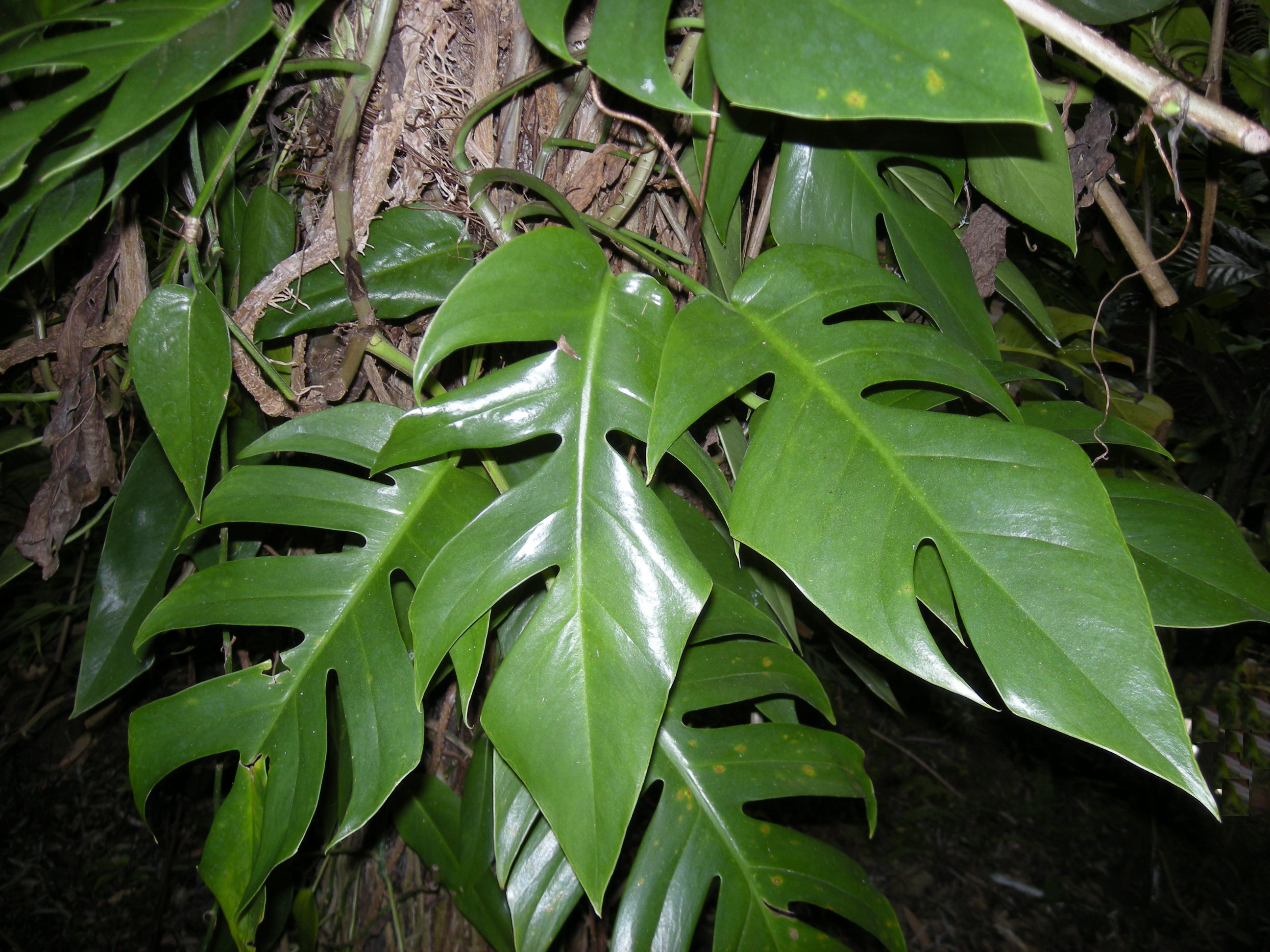
various forms of leaves in different sizes

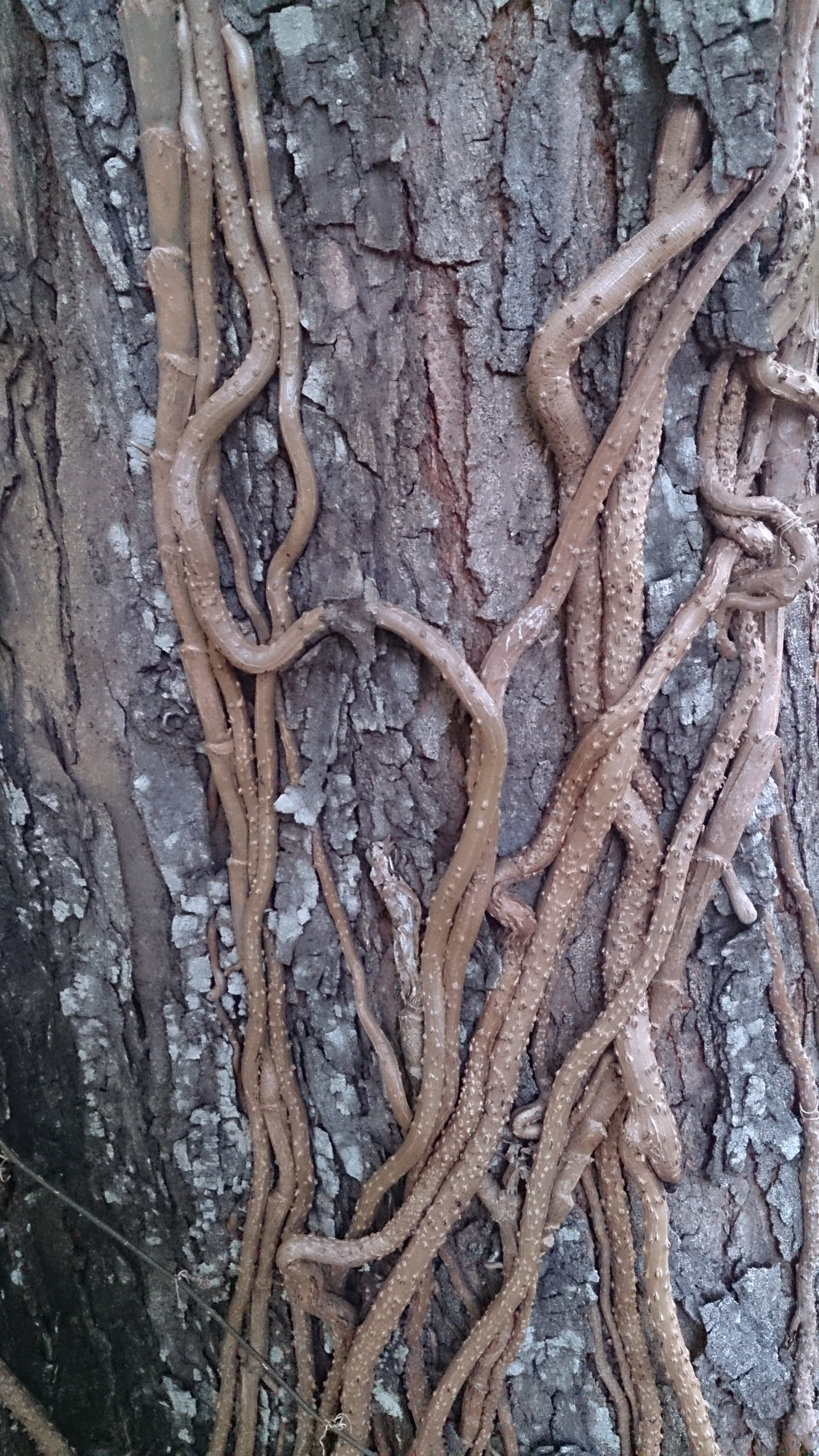
Aerial roots
