= Cornelis Rugier Willem Karel van Alderwerelt van Rosenburgh =

Dutch botanist

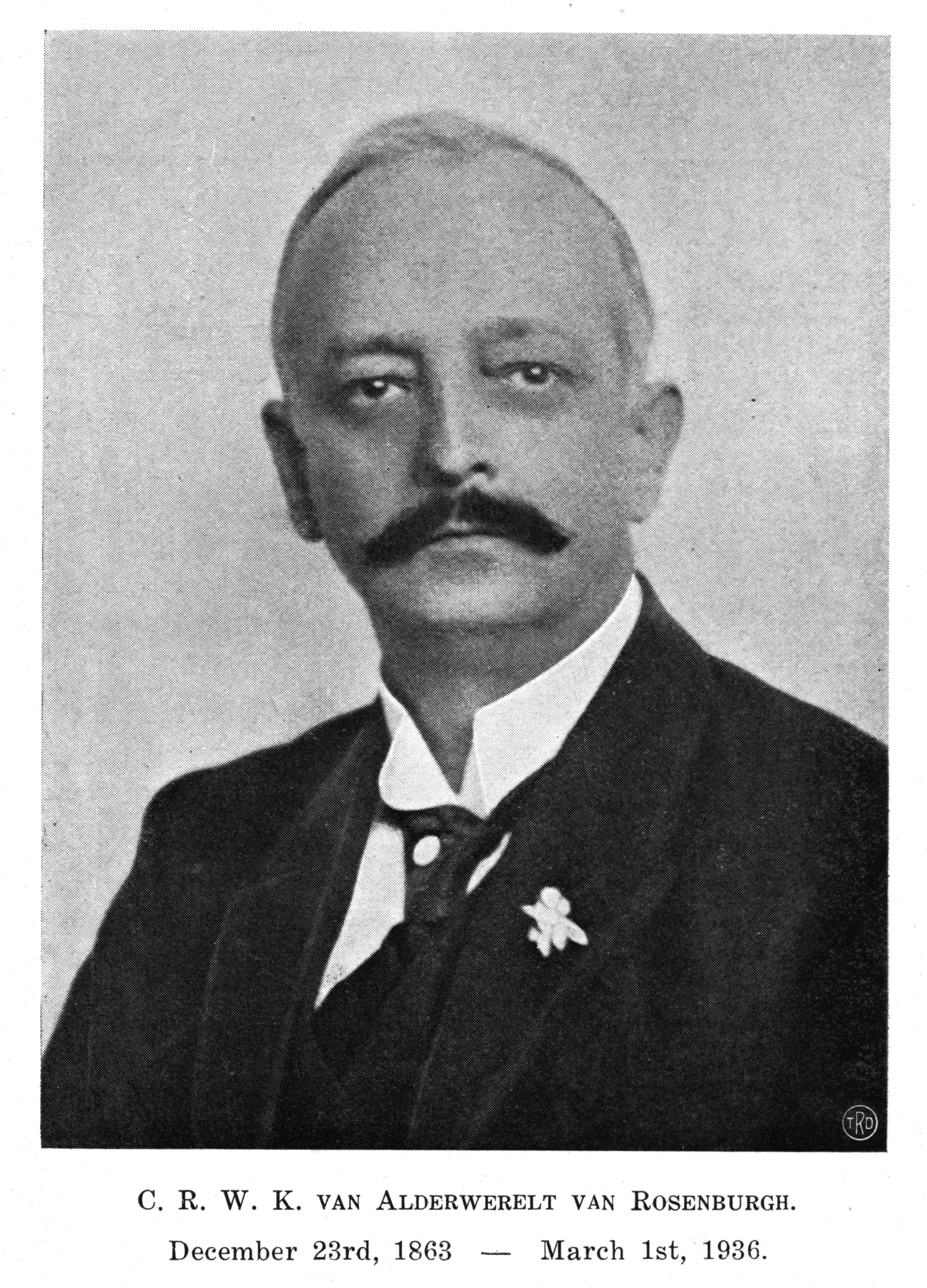
- Born: 23 December 1863; Java Island
- Died: 1 March 1936 (aged 72); The Hague
- Known for: Botanical taxonomy
- Scientific career
- Fields: Botany
- Author abbrev. (botany): Alderw, v.A.v.R.

Cornelis Rugier Willem Karel van Alderwerelt van Rosenburgh (Java Island, 23 December 1863 – The Hague, 1 March 1936) was a Dutch botanist.

The standard author abbreviation Alderw. is used to indicate this person as the author when citing a botanical name. Many older texts instead use the abbreviation "v.A.v.R."

== Works ==
- Malayan ferns. 1908
- Malayan fern allies. Handbook to the determination of the fern allies of the Malayan islands (incl. those of the Malay peninsula, the Philippines and New Guinea). – Batavia: Department of Agriculture, Industry and Commerce Netherlands India, 1915. Disponible en téléchargement (Première édition : 1908), Supplément en 1917).
- Malayan ferns and fern allies. 1917.
- New and Interesting Malayan Ferns. A series of papers, published in the Bulletin du Départmente de l'Agriculture aux Indes Néerlandaises and the Bulletin du Jardin de Botanique Buitenzorg:
  - New or interesting Malayan ferns. Bull. Dept. Agric. Indes Néerlandaises. 18: 1–28. 1908.
  - New or interesting Malayan ferns 2. Bull. Dept. Agric. Indes Néerlandaises. 21: 1–9. 1908.
  - New or interesting Malayan ferns 3. Bull. Jard. Bot. Buit. II, 1: 1–29. 1911.
  - New or interesting Malayan ferns 4. Bull. Jard. Bot. Buit. II, 7: 1–41. 1912.
  - New or interesting Malayan ferns 5. Bull. Jard. Bot. Buit. II, 11: 1–38. 1913.
  - New or interesting Malayan ferns 6. Bull. Jard. Bot. Buit. II, 16: 1–60. 1914.
  - New or interesting Malayan ferns 7. Bull. Jard. Bot. Buit. II, 20: 1–28. 1915.
  - New or interesting Malayan ferns 8. Bull. Jard. Bot. Buit. II, 23: 1–27. 1916.
  - New or interesting Malayan ferns 9. Bull. Jard. Bot. Buit. II, 24: 1–8. 1917.
  - New or interesting Malayan ferns 10. Bull. Jard. Bot. Buit. II, 28: 1–66. 1918.
  - New or interesting Malayan ferns 11. Bull. Jard. Bot. Buit. III, 2: 129–186. 1920.
  - New or interesting Malayan ferns 12. Bull. Jard. Bot. Buit. III, 5: 179–246. 1922–1923.
