= Common Solomon's seal =

Common Solomon's seal is a common name for several plants. It may refer to:

- Polygonatum biflorum, native to North America
- Polygonatum × hybridum, commonly cultivated as an ornamental
- Polygonatum multiflorum, native to Europe and Asia
