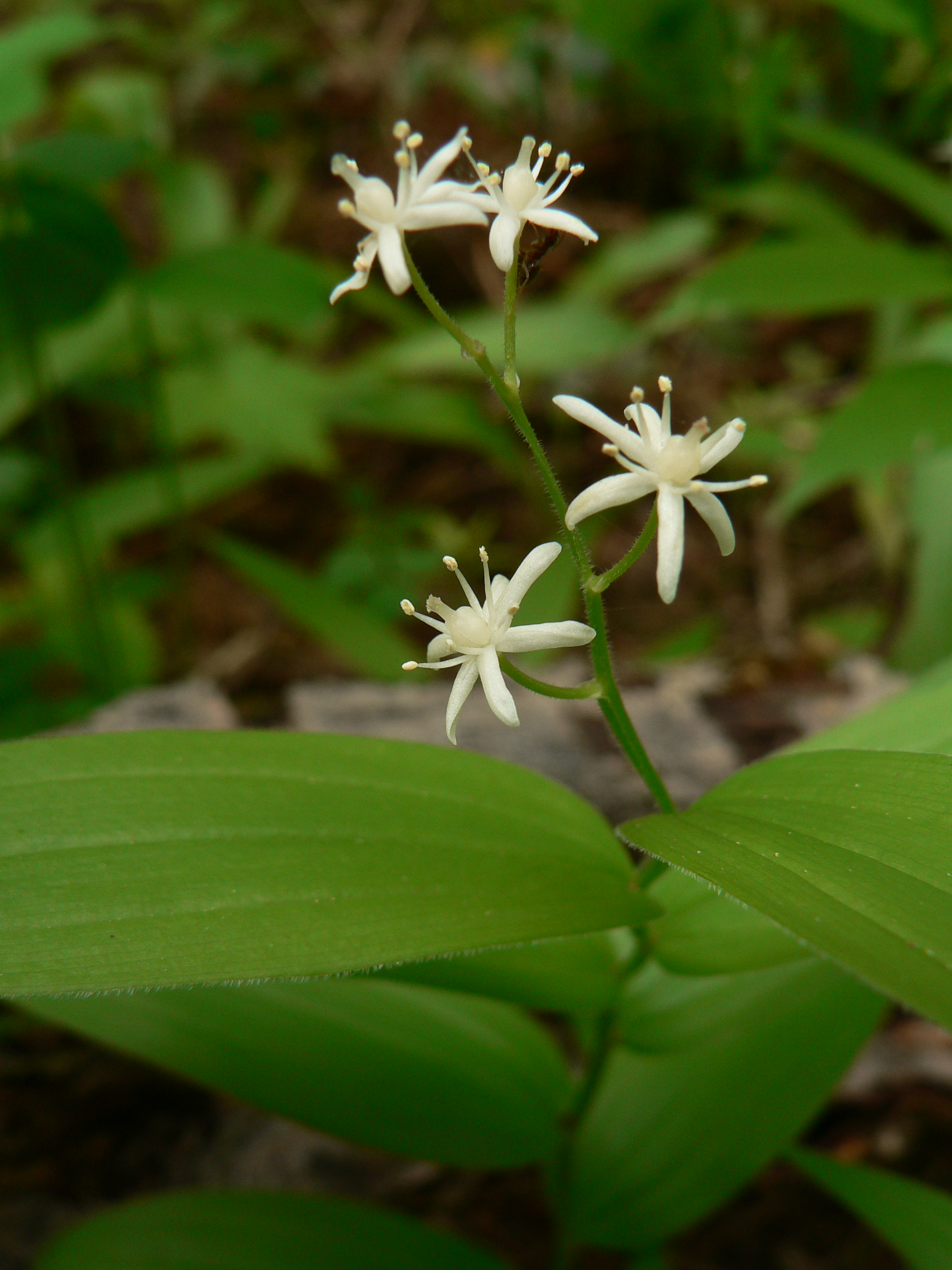
- M. stellatum in the Wenatchee National Forest, Washington, U.S.A.

Conservation status
- Secure (NatureServe)

Scientific classification
- Kingdom: Plantae
- Clade: Embryophytes
- Clade: Tracheophytes
- Clade: Spermatophytes
- Clade: Angiosperms
- Clade: Monocots
- Order: Asparagales
- Family: Asparagaceae
- Subfamily: Convallarioideae
- Genus: Maianthemum
- Species: M. stellatum

Binomial name
- Maianthemum stellatum (L.) Link

Synonyms
- Synonymy: Asteranthemum stellatum (L.) Nieuwl.; Asteranthemum vulgare Kunth; Asteranthemum vulgare var. uniflorum (Pursh) Kunth; Convallaria hybrida Marchal; Convallaria stellata L.; Smilacina liliacea (Greene) F.L. Wynd; Smilacina sessilifolia Nutt. ex Baker; Smilacina stellata (L.) Desf.; Smilacina stellata fo. paniculata H. St. John; Smilacina stellata var. crassa Vict.; Smilacina stellata var. sessilifolia L.F. Hend.; Smilacina stellata var. sylvatica Vict. & J. Rousseau; Smilacina stellata var. uniflora Pursh; Tovaria sessilifolia Baker; Tovaria stellata (L.) Neck. ex Baker; Unifolium liliaceum Greene; Unifolium sessilifolium (Baker) Greene; Unifolium stellatum (L.) Greene; Vagnera angustifolia Raf.; Vagnera leptopetala Rydb.; Vagnera liliacea (Greene) Rydb.; Vagnera sessilifolia (Baker) Greene; Vagnera stellata (L.) Morong; Vagnera stellata var. mollis Farw.

= Maianthemum stellatum =

Species of flowering plant

Maianthemum stellatum (star-flowered, starry, or little false Solomon's seal, or simply false Solomon's seal; star-flowered lily-of-the-valley or starry false lily of the valley; (syn. Smilacina stellata) is a species of flowering plant, native across North America. It has been found in northern Mexico, every Canadian province and territory except Nunavut, and in every US state except Hawaii and the states of the Southeast. It has little white buds in the spring, followed by delicate starry flowers, then green-and-black striped berries ripening to deep red or black in the fall.

== Description ==
Maianthemum stellatum is a perennial plant that grows to 25–50 centimeters in height. Its erect stem will have eight to eleven leaves and sprout from sympodially branching branching rhizomes, often forming dense patches. They are 15–60 cm long with a width of just 3–4.5 millimeters and covered in scattered roots.

=== Leaves ===
Leaves can be variable but are usually clasping and often blue-green and folded along the mid-rib.

=== Flowering clusters ===
Flowers are set in an un-branched cluster (raceme) at the tip of the flowering stem. Racemes are 1.5–5 cm long and 6–15-flowered. Flowers are set at one per node along the flowering stem, on stalks (pedicles) 6–12 mm long.

=== Flowers and fruits ===
Flowers are made up of six spreading white tepals 3–5 mm long. Green berries have distinctive dark stripes, eventually ripening to a deep red-black.

== Distribution ==
Native across North America generally from Alaska to California to North Carolina to Newfoundland, plus northern Mexico (Sonora, Chihuahua, Coahuila, Nuevo León). It has been found in every Canadian province and territory except Nunavut, and in every US state except Hawaii and the states of the Southeast.

== Habitat and ecology ==
Found in open woods, prairies and shorelines.

== Similar species ==
Maianthemum stellatum is smaller than its close relative M. racemosum. For comparison, M. stellatum has smaller, more open inflorescences that are un-branched and have fewer flowers, flowers with stamens shorter rather than longer than the tepals, and usually somewhat narrower and more curved leaves. Both species show the characteristic zigzag of the stem between the alternate leaves. True Solomon's seal (Polygonatum multiflorum and related species) have a similar overall appearance, but the flowers hang from the stem underneath the leaves, rather than forming a terminal cluster.

== Gallery ==
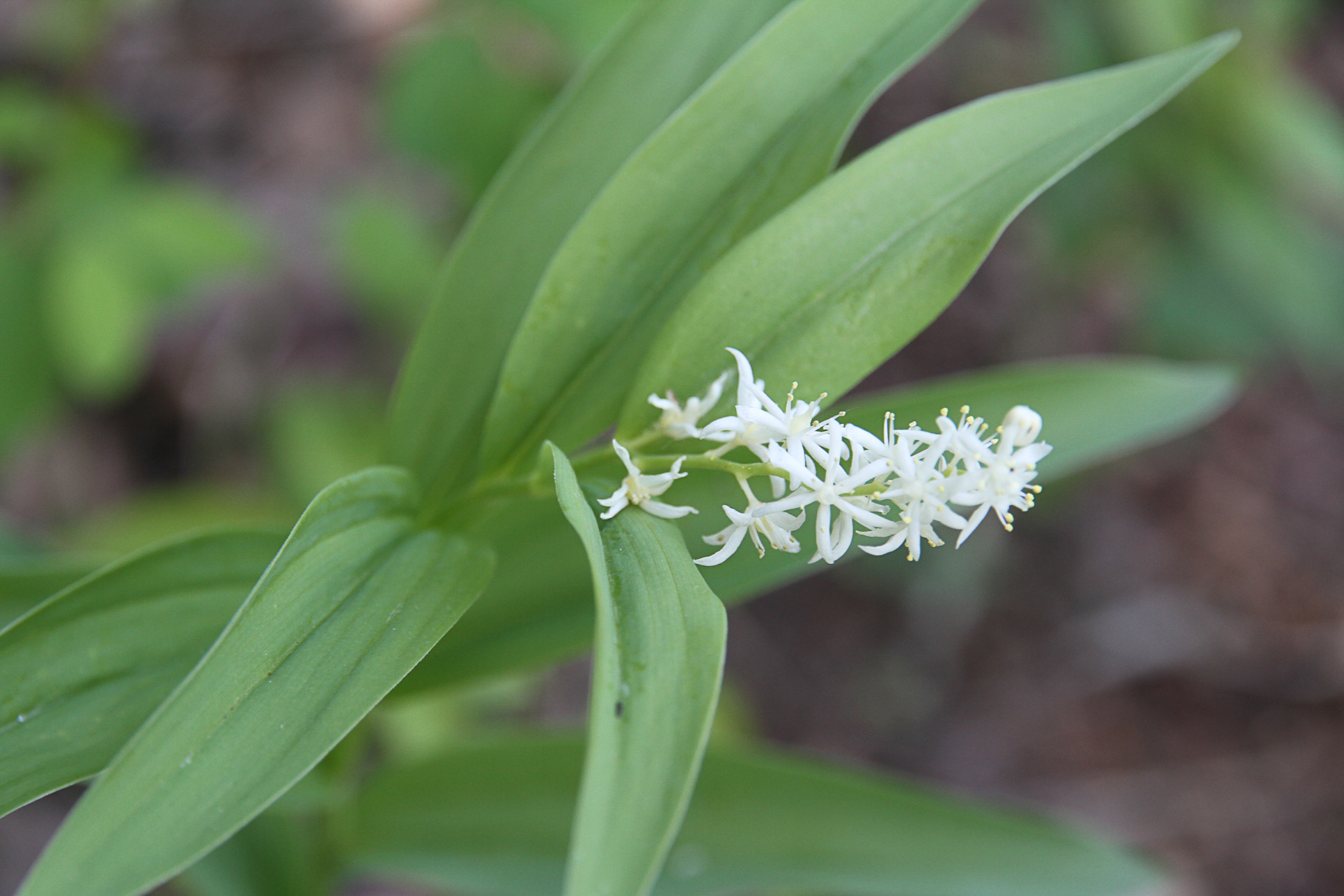
Flowers

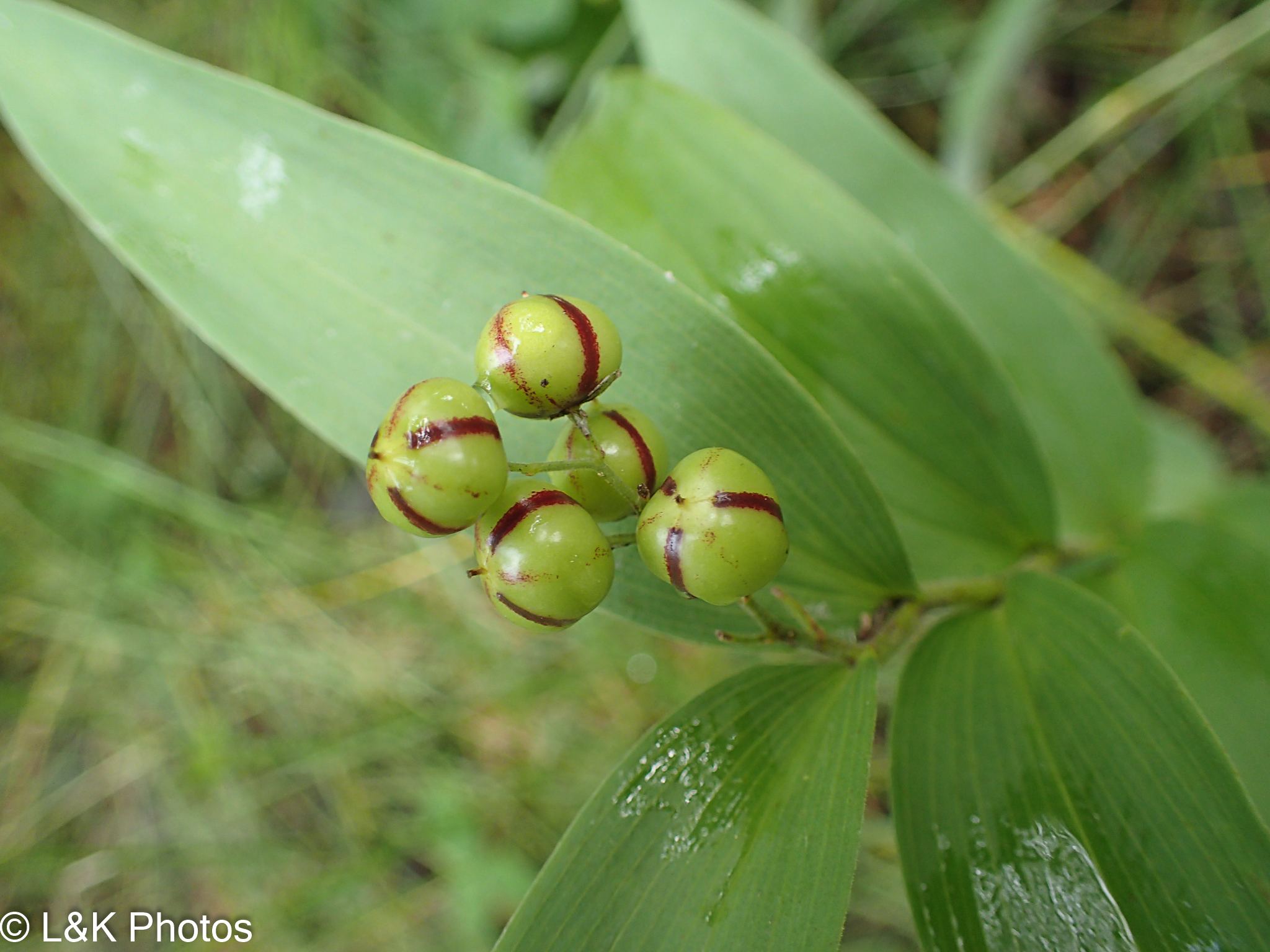
Green berries with dark stripes

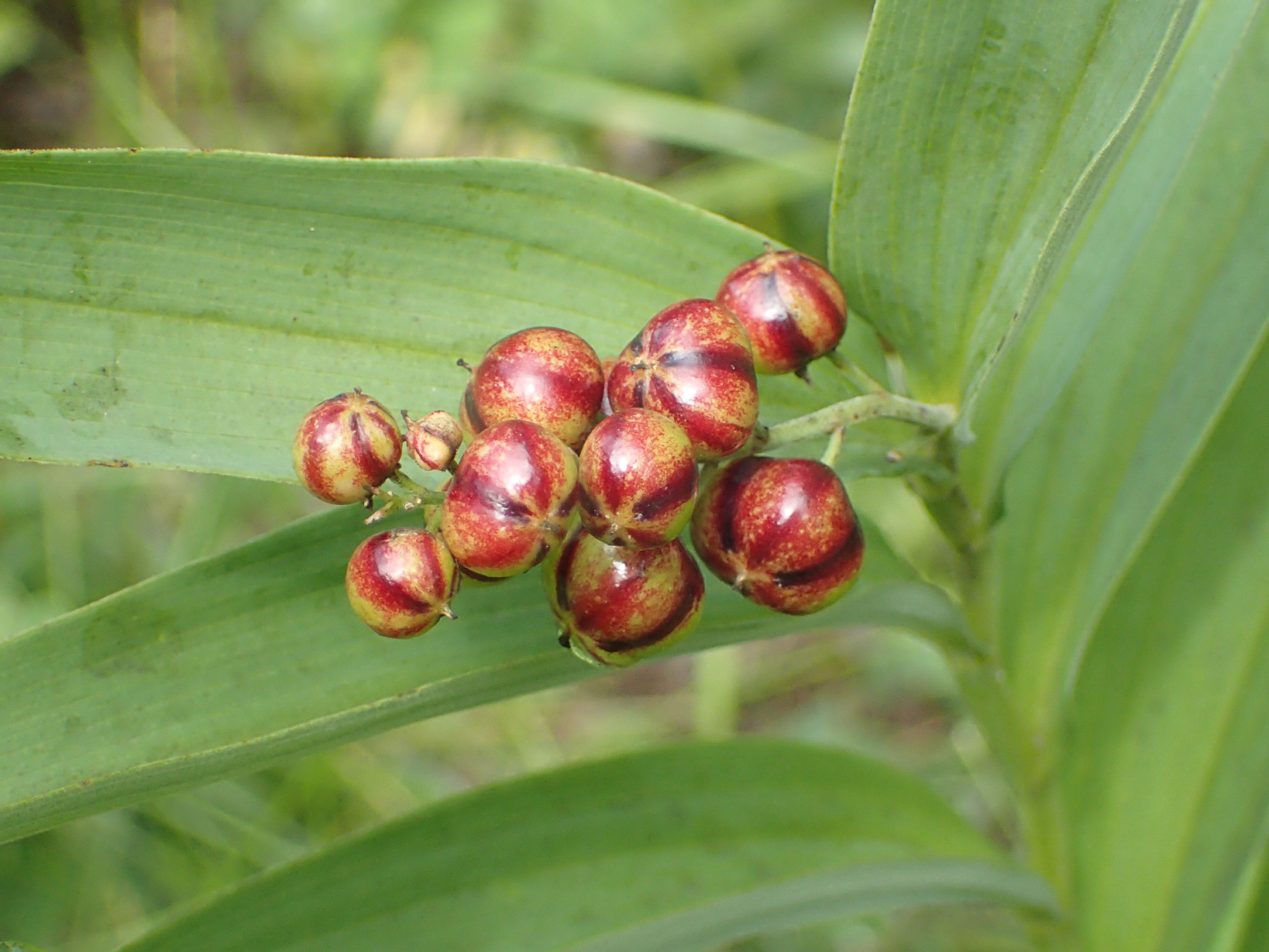
Berries ripening

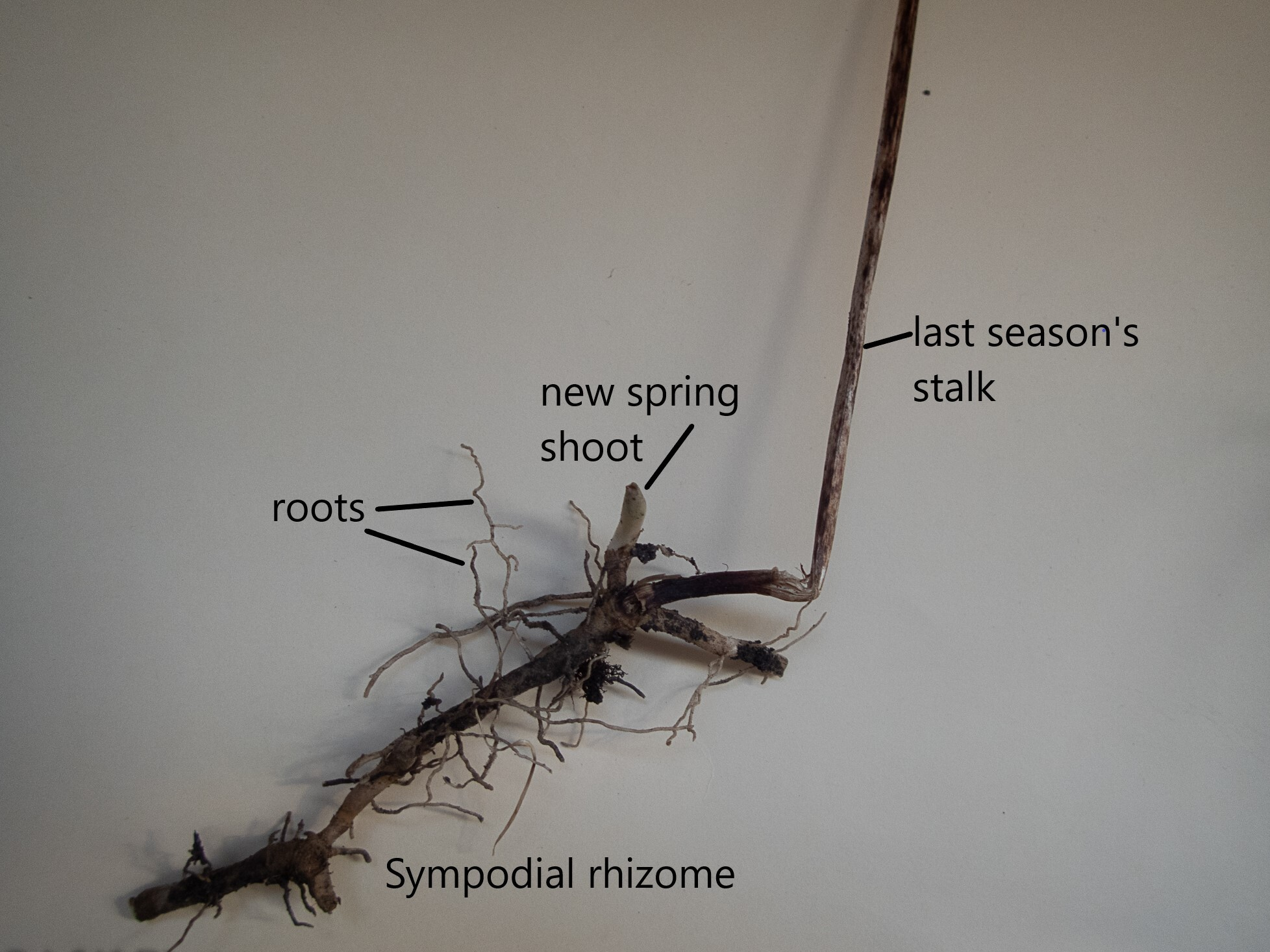
rhizome and roots

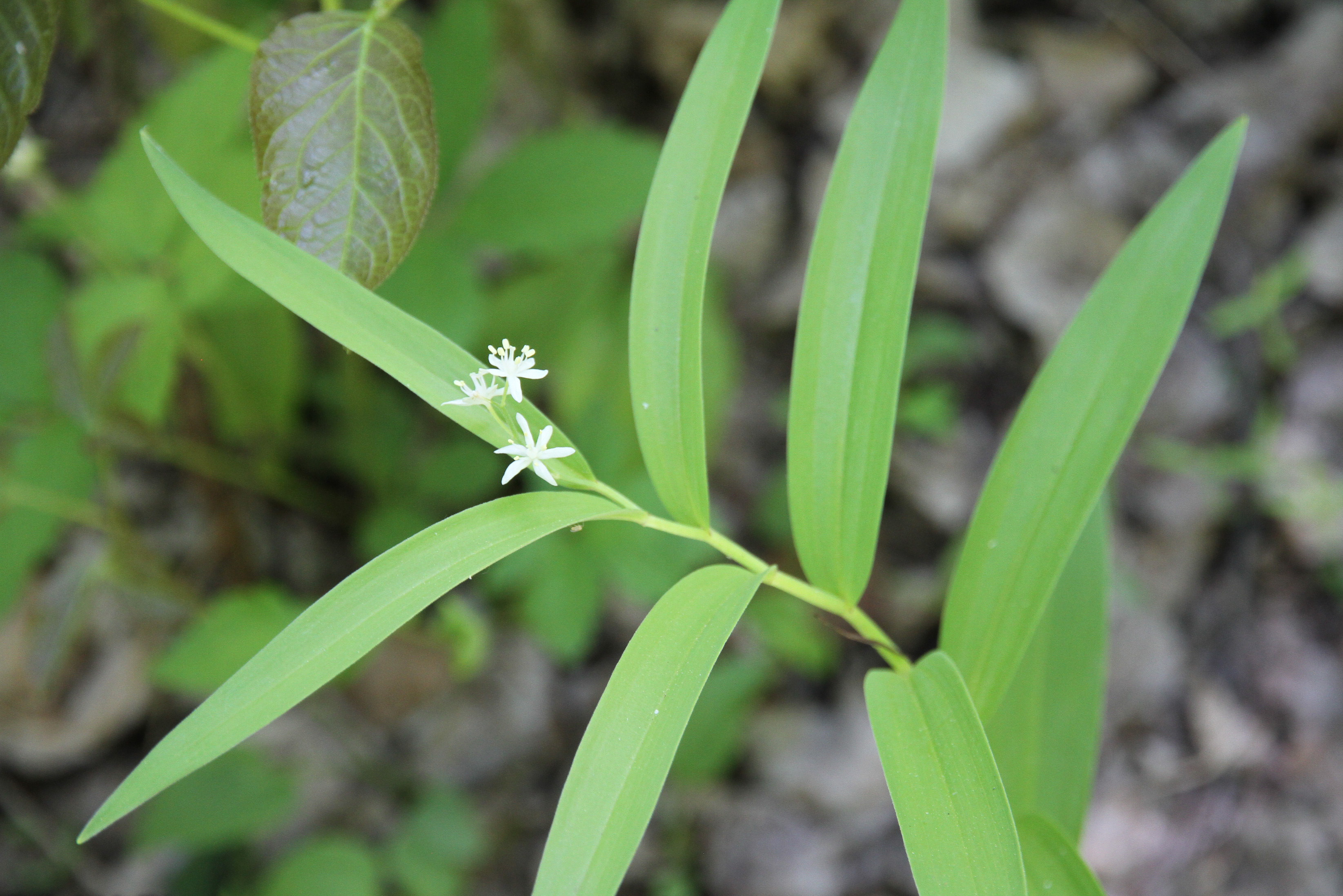
flowers and leaves

== See also ==
- Maianthemum racemosum, false Solomon's seal
- Polygonatum biflorum, Solomon's seal
