= Felix Haurowitz =

Czech-American biochemist (1896–1987)

Felix Michael Haurowitz (March 1, 1896 – December 2, 1987) was a Czech-American medical doctor and biochemist.

== Biography ==
Haurowitz was born on March 1, 1896 in Prague, Bohemia, Austria-Hungary. He spoke German as his native language but also spoke fluent Czech from early childhood. During his secondary education in a gymnasium in Prague, he also took private lessons in English, French, and Italian. In November 1915, he was drafted into the Austro-Hungarian Army and assigned to an Austrian artillery unit. Based upon his outstanding performance in an officers' school in Hungary, he was given command of an artillery battalion. In April 1918, he was granted leave to enroll in the medical school of the German University in Prague (which is now Charles University). There he worked under the supervision of the hemoglobin chemist Richard von Zeynek (1869–1945) and Hedwig Langecker. Haurowitz spent a semester at the University of Wurzburg, where he met the protein chemist Franz Hofmeister. In Prague, Haurowitz graduated in 1922 with an M.D. degree and in 1923 was awarded the Dr. rer. nat. (D.Sc.) for several papers published between 1920 and 1923. He visited Leonor Michaelis's laboratory in Berlin, where he learned physicochemical methods, such as pH measurement, from the biochemist Peter Rona (1871–1945). During the summer of 1924, Haurowitz worked on the purification of gastric lipase in the Munich laboratory of Richard Willstätter. In 1925, Haurowitz was appointed a docent in Prague and this gave him the financial security to marry Regina "Gina" Hedvika Perutz (1903–1983) in June 1925. She was a cousin of Max Perutz. On a visit to Felix and Gina Haurowitz, Perutz became interested in the problem of determining the chemical structure of hemoglobin.

In Prague, Haurowitz introduced courses on biophysical chemistry and recent advances in biochemistry. In 1930, he was appointed professor extraordinarius (associate professor) with tenure. From 1925 to 1936, he gained an international reputation for his research on hemoglobin. He determined methemoglobin's absorption spectra and was the first to crystallize several derivatives of hemoglobin. He was among the first researchers to provide convincing evidence that antibodies are serum globulins. In 1938, he made the important discovery that exposure to oxygen can shatter deoxygenated crystals of hemoglobin. Karl Landsteiner pioneered the use of haptens for research in immunochemistry. Landsteiner's techniques were developed by Haurowitz for "quantitative determination of the composition of the antigen-antibody precipitate, calculation of dissociation constants, and other parameters of the antibody-antigen interaction."

In the 1930s and early 1940s, Haurowitz and Friedrich Breinl (1888–1936), as well as other scientists including Jerome Alexander, Stuart Mudd, William Whiteman Carlton Topley, and, most notably, Linus Pauling, proposed variants of the now-discredited template theory of antibody formation.

In 1938, Haurowitz was working at Copenhagen's Carlsberg Laboratory at the invitation of the Danish biochemist Albert Fischer, when the Munich Agreement was made. Haurowitz was alarmed by the news, and returned to Prague to be with his wife and their two children. He was briefly mobilized as an M.D. in the Czech army but was demobilized when Czechoslovakia ceded the Sudetenland to Germany. He with his wife and their two children fled to Istanbul. At Istanbul University, he headed the department of biological chemistry and was a professor from 1939 to 1948. By the end of his second year at Istanbul University, he lectured and gave examinations in Turkish. While in Istanbul, he served as a conduit for many people under Nazi-occupation and their contacts in Allied countries.

In 1946, Gina Haurowitz with the children, Alice (born 1929) and Martin (born 1931), moved to the United States. However, Felix Haurowitz spent two more years at Istanbul University to fulfill his academic contract, but he did visit his family in 1947. He emigrated in 1948 to the United States and in 1952 became a naturalized citizen. At Indiana University, he was a professor of chemistry from 1948 to 1966, when he retired as professor emeritus. He was the author of 11 books and was the author or coauthor of about 350 scientific papers. At Indiana University, he was a close friend of Harry G. Day.

Haurowitz died on December 2, 1987 in Bloomington, Indiana.

== Awards and honors ==
- 1956 – Member of the German National Academy of Sciences Leopoldina
- 1960 – Paul Ehrlich and Ludwig Darmstaedter Prize
- 1970 – Fellow of the American Academy of Arts and Sciences
- 1971 — Award for Distinguished Services to Immunology, given by the International Union of Immunological Societies at the First International Congress of Immunology, Washington, D.C.
- 1973 – Doctor of Medicine (honorary) from the University of Istanbul
- 1974 – Doctor of Philosophy (honorary) from Indiana University
- 1975 – Member of the National Academy of Sciences

== Selected publications ==
=== Articles ===
- Haurowitz, Felix; Astrup, Tage (1939). "Ultra-violet Absorption of Genuine and Hydrolysed Protein". Nature. 143 (3612): 118–119. Bibcode:1939Natur.143..118H. doi:10.1038/143118b0. S2CID 4078416.
- Haurowitz, F.; Crampton, C. F. (1952). "The fate in rabbits of intravenously injected I^{131}-iodoovalbumin". The Journal of Immunology. 68 (1): 73–85. doi:10.4049/jimmunol.68.1.73. PMID 14908086. S2CID 43864957.
- Würz, Hannelore; Haurowitz, Felix (1961). "Changes in the Optical Rotation of Proteins after Cleavage of the Disulfide Bonds1,2". Journal of the American Chemical Society. 83 (2): 280–283. Bibcode:1961JAChS..83..280W. doi:10.1021/ja01463a005.

=== Books ===
- Biochemie des Menschen und der Tiere seit 1914 (1925)
- Fortschritte der Biochemie (1932)
- Chemistry and Biology of Proteins (1949); pbk edition 1963 ASIN B000R0BU8Y
- Immunochemistry and the Biosynthesis of Antibodies (1950)
- Biochemistry: an Introductory Textbook. New York: J. Wiley & Sons, Inc., 1955. ASIN B00JCVDKM8
- Progress in Biochemistry since 1949. S. Karger. 1958. ISBN 978-3805508711; pbk, 358 pages
