= Streptomyces polygonati =

Scientific classification
- Domain: Bacteria
- Kingdom: Bacillati
- Phylum: Actinomycetota
- Class: Actinomycetia
- Order: Streptomycetales
- Family: Streptomycetaceae
- Genus: Streptomyces
- Species: S. polygonati

Binomial name
- Streptomyces polygonati Guo et al. 2016

Type strain
- CGMCC 4.7237, DSM 100521, NEAU-G9

Species of bacterium

Streptomyces polygonati is a bacterium species from the genus of Streptomyces which has been isolated from the root of the plant Polygonatum odoratum in Harbin in China.

== See also ==
- List of Streptomyces species
