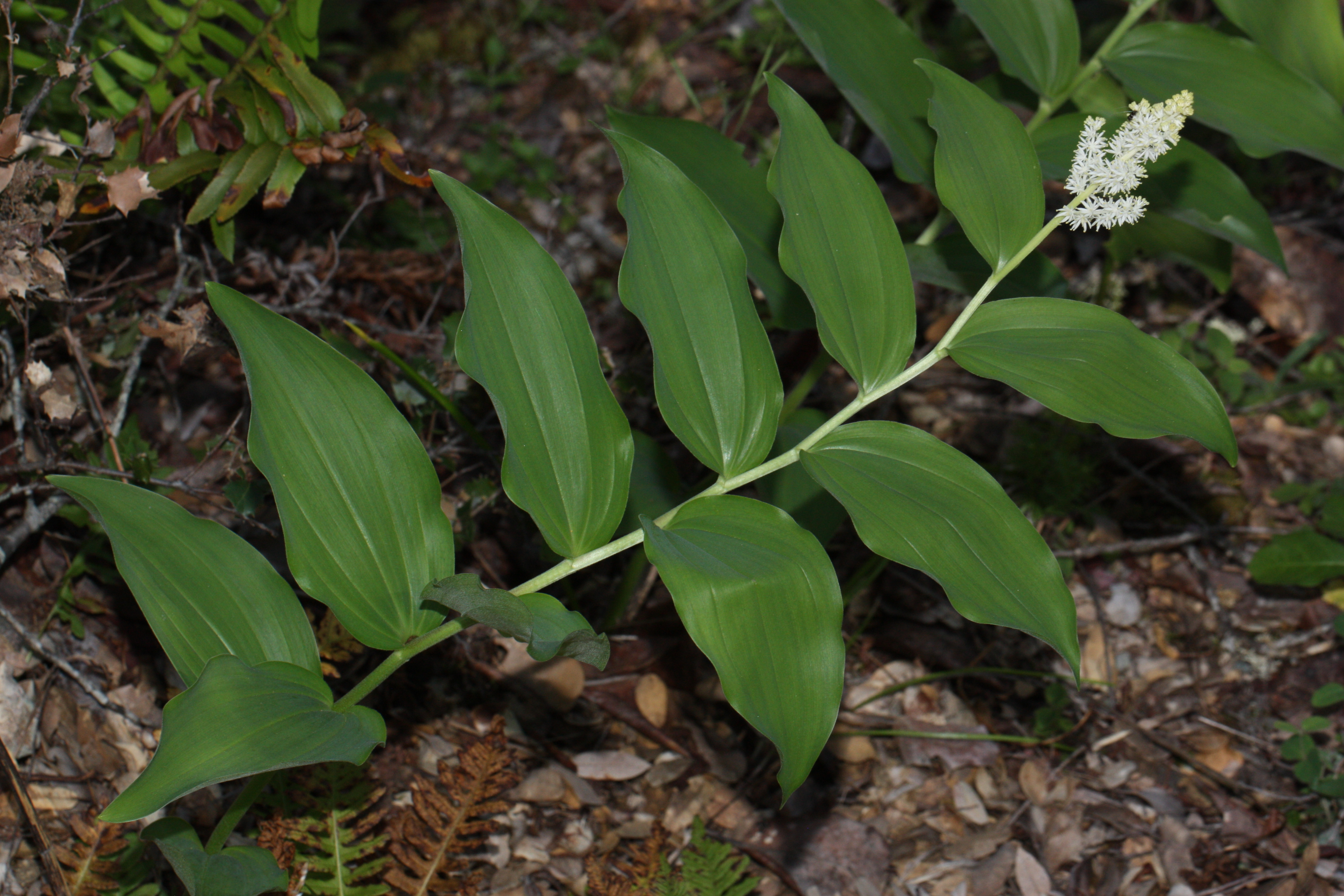

Conservation status
- Secure (NatureServe)

Scientific classification
- Kingdom: Plantae
- Clade: Embryophytes
- Clade: Tracheophytes
- Clade: Spermatophytes
- Clade: Angiosperms
- Clade: Monocots
- Order: Asparagales
- Family: Asparagaceae
- Subfamily: Convallarioideae
- Genus: Maianthemum
- Species: M. racemosum

Binomial name
- Maianthemum racemosum (L.) Link

Synonyms
- Synonyms list: *Convallaria ciliata (Desf.) Poir.; Convallaria racemosa L.; Polygonastrum racemosum (L.) Moench; Sigillaria ciliata (Desf.) Raf.; Sigillaria multiflora Raf.; Smilacina ciliata Desf.; Smilacina flexicaulis Wender.; Smilacina latifolia Nutt. ex Baker; Smilacina racemosa (L.) Desf.; Smilacina racemosa var. cylindrata Fernald; Smilacina racemosa f. foliosa Vict.; Smilacina racemosa var. lanceolata B.Boivin; Tovaria racemosa (L.) Neck. ex Baker; Unifolium racemosum (L.) Britton; Vagnera australis Small; Vagnera racemosa (L.) Morong ex Kearney; Vagnera retusa Raf.

= Maianthemum racemosum =

Species of flowering plant

Maianthemum racemosum, the treacleberry, feathery false lily of the valley, false Solomon's seal, Solomon's plume or false spikenard, is a species of flowering plant native to North America. It is a common, widespread plant with numerous common names and synonyms, known from every US state except Hawaii, and from every Canadian province and territory (except Nunavut and the Yukon), as well as from Mexico.

== Description ==
It is a woodland herbaceous perennial plant growing to 50–90 centimetres (20–35 inches) tall, with 7–12 alternate, oblong-lanceolate leaves 7–15 cm (2 3/4–6 in) long and 3–6 cm (1 1/8–2 3/8 in) broad. The leaf bases are rounded to clasping or tapered, sometimes with a short petiole. The leaf tips are pointed to long-tipped.

Seven to 250 small flowers are produced on a 10–15 cm (4–6 in) panicle that has well-developed branches. Each flower has six white tepals 3–6 millimetres (1/8–1/4 in) long and is set on a short pedicel usually less than 1 mm long. Blooming is mid-spring with fruiting by early summer. The plants produce fruits that are rounded to 3-lobed and green with copper spots when young, turning red in late summer.

It spreads by cylindrical rhizomes up to 0.3 metres (1 ft) long with scattered roots.

M. racemosum closely resembles members of the genus Veratrum, a highly toxic group of plants to which it is distantly related, as well as baneberry.

== Taxonomy ==
=== Subspecies ===
The Flora of North America recognizes two subspecies: amplexicaule (Nuttall) LaFrankie and racemosum. They are geographically separated, with subsp. amplexicaule a western subspecies and subsp. racemosum found in the east, with some overlap in the central states. The western plants (subsp. amplexicaule) have erect stems and leaves with a clasping, rounded base and upper leaves with tips with short points. The eastern subspecies (subsp. racemosum) tends to have arching stems, leaves with a short petiole and upper leaf-tips with an extended point 12–25 mm (1/2–1 in) long. Phylogenetic analyses however show there to be molecular differences and those differences, combined with the geographical separation and morphological differences suggest that these should be considered separate species: M. amplexicaule (Nutt.) W.A. Weber for the western species and M. racemosum (Linnaeus) Link for the eastern.

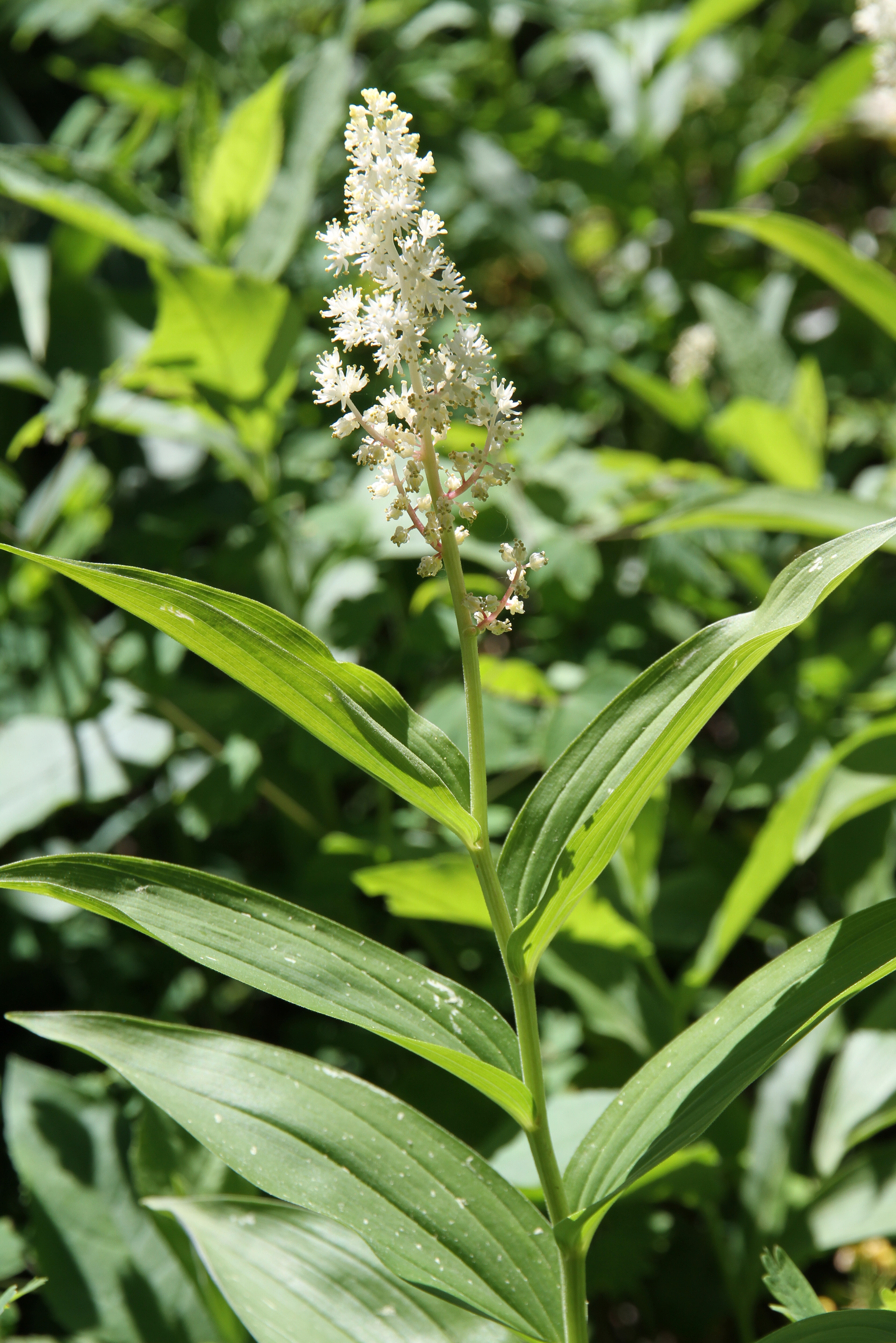
M. r. subsp. amplexicaule plant with upper leaves and flower cluster

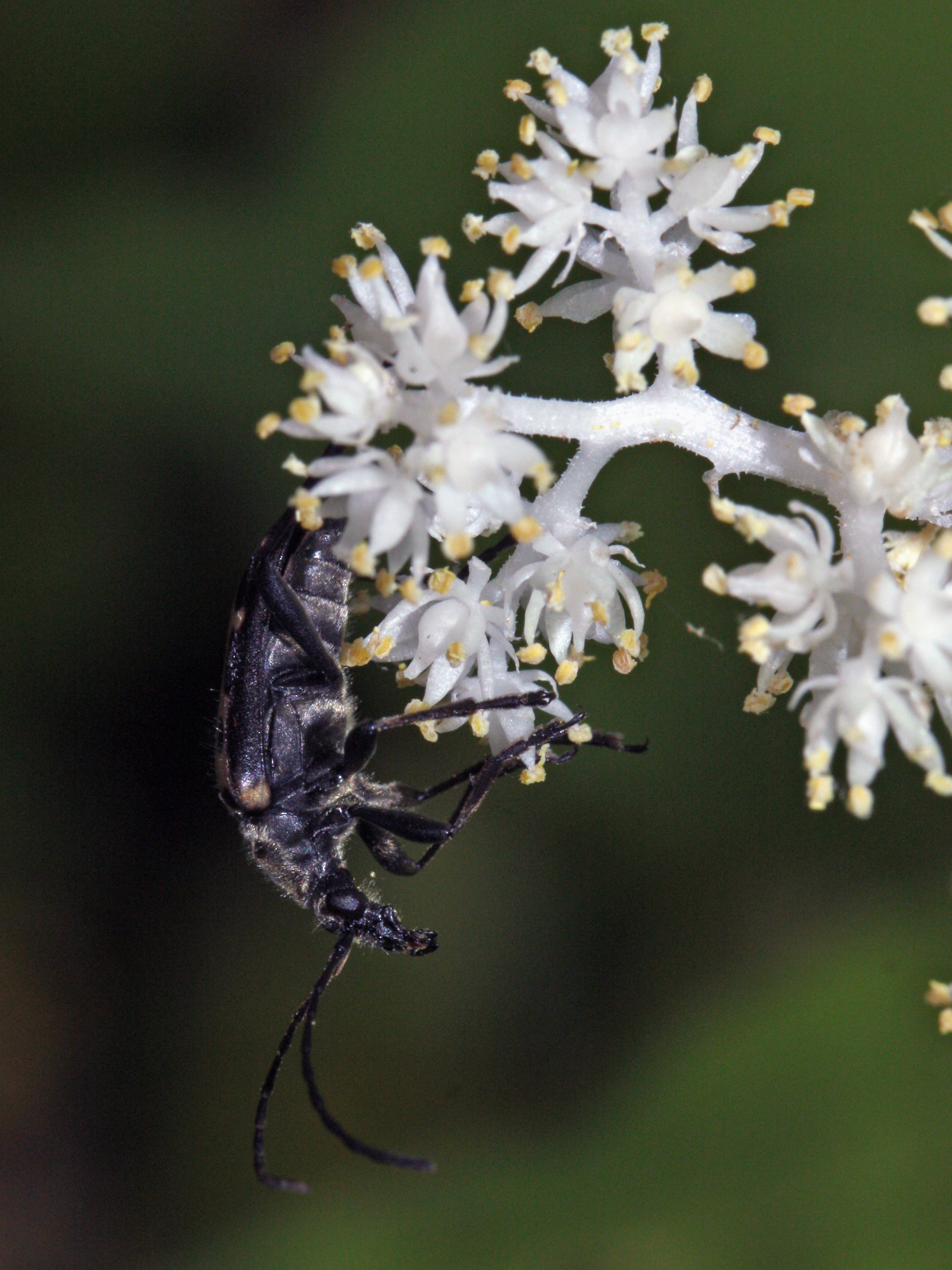
M. r. subsp. amplexicaule, Olympic National Park

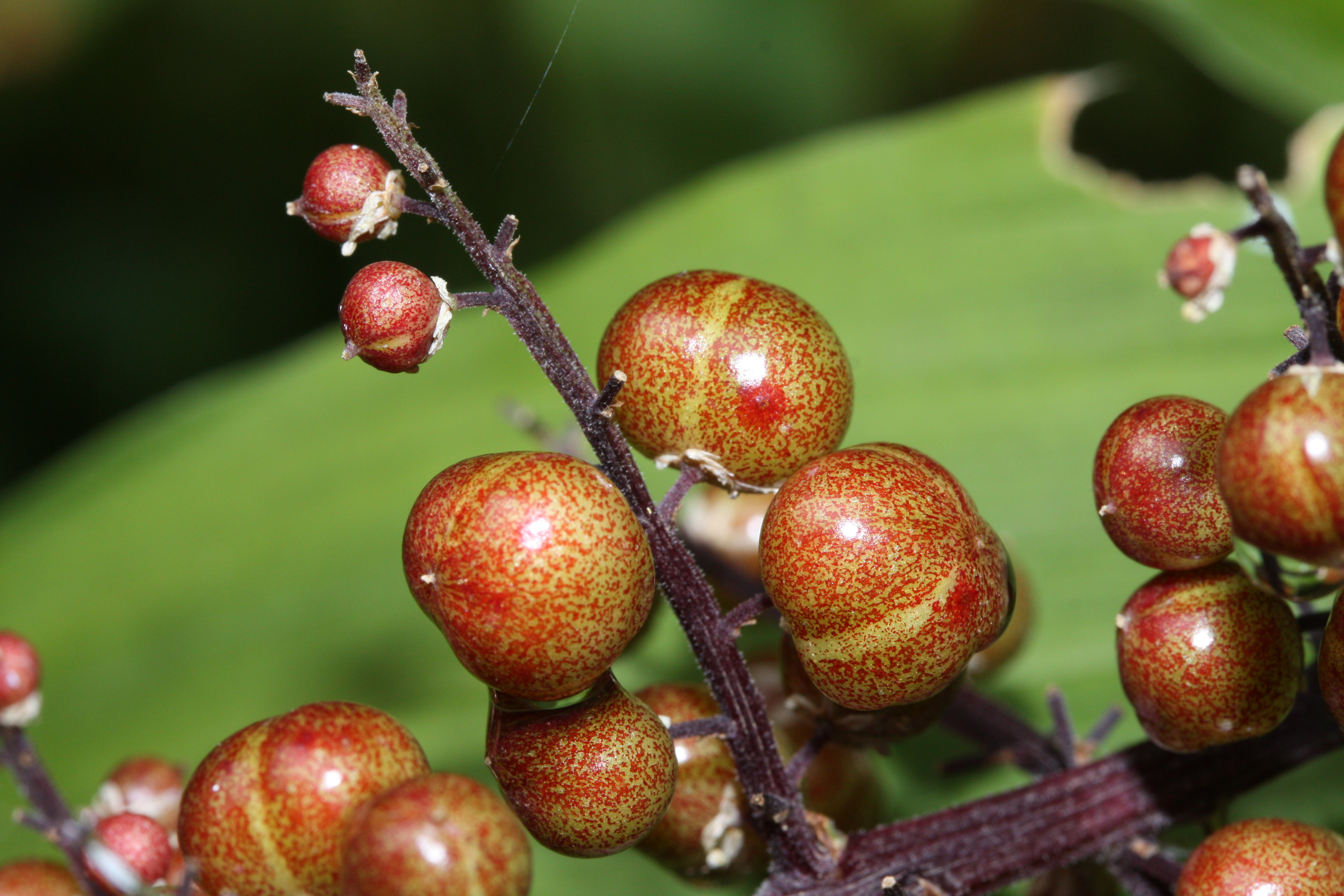
M. r. subsp. amplexicaule fruit, Mount Baker-Snoqualmie National Forest

=== Etymology ===
The Latin specific epithet racemosum means "with flowers that appear in racemes", which can cause confusion as the inflorescence is a panicle; it is the individual branches of the panicle that have flowers arranged in a raceme.

== Distribution and habitat ==
The species is widespread, found in all Canadian provinces and territories except the Yukon and Nunavut, all US states except Hawaii, and in Northern Mexico. Subsp. amplexicaule has been found in western Canada in Alta, B.C., N.W.T., Sask.; and in the western US in Alaska, Ariz., Calif., Colo., Idaho, Mont., Nev., N.Mex., N.Dak., Oreg., S.Dak., Tex., Utah, Wash., Wyo. Also found in Mexico, in Chihuahua, Coahuila and Veracruz. The eastern subspecies (subsp. racemosum) is found in Canada from Manitoba east, and in all eastern US states. Both subspecies are found in the Dakotas and in Texas.

The plant grows in habitats in North America up to elevations of 2,743 m (9,000 ft). The most robust and profuse occurrences of this plant are typically found in partial shade and deep, moist, soft soils. In the western part of North America an example typical habitat would be in a shaded ravine or riparian corridor with common understory associates of Dryopteris arguta, Trillium ovatum and Adiantum jordanii.

== Cultivation ==
The plant, like the closely related Polygonatum (Solomon's seal), is suitable for cultivation in moist, humus-rich soil in a woodland setting or in dappled shade. It has gained the Royal Horticultural Society's Award of Garden Merit.

== Uses ==
Because it resembles plants of the highly toxic Veratrum genus, this species should not be consumed unless identification is positive. The plant becomes fibrous and bitter after it completes flowering and seed-setting, but the tender young shoots can be stripped of their leaves, simmered in water and eaten. Their delicate flavor is somewhat reminiscent of asparagus. The ripe fruits are edible raw or cooked but may be poor in taste. They can be laxative if consumed in large quantities.

Ojibwe harvested the roots of this plant and cooked them in lye water overnight to remove the bitterness and neutralize their strong laxative qualities. Native Americans boiled the roots to make tea for medicinal purposes, including to treat rheumatism, kidney issues, and wounds and back injuries.

== Gallery ==
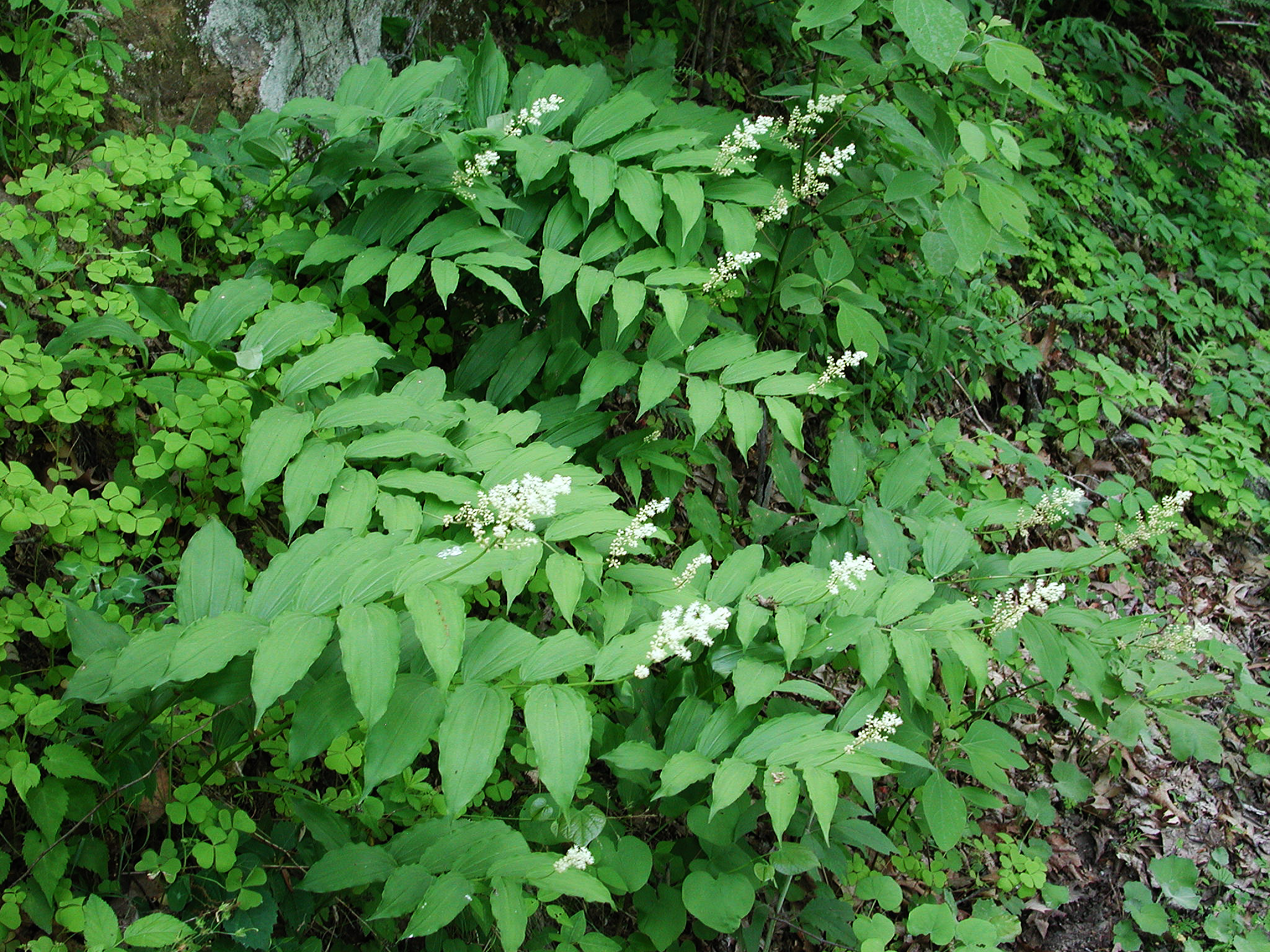
Blooming on roadside

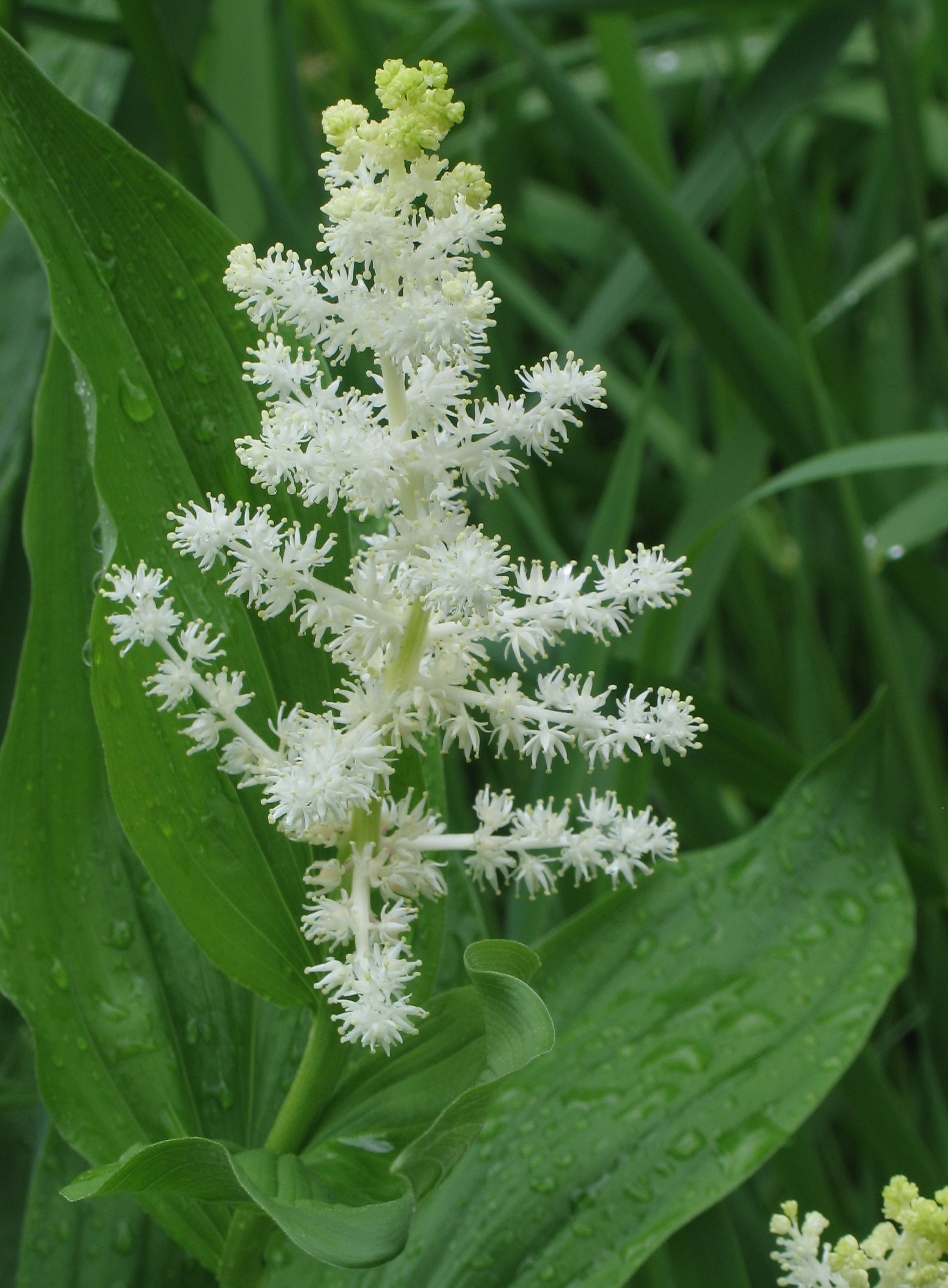
Blooming panicle

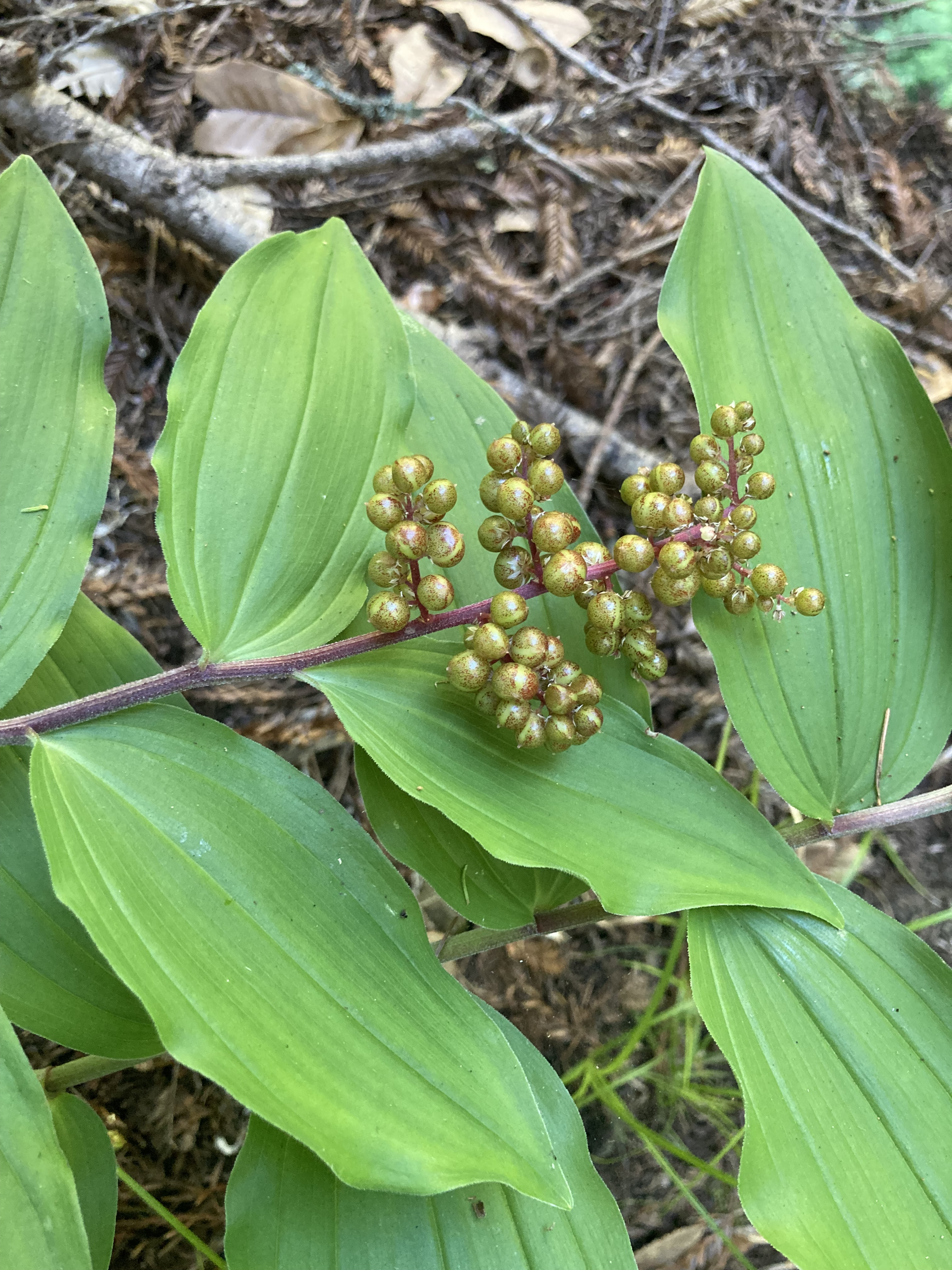
Unripe fruit

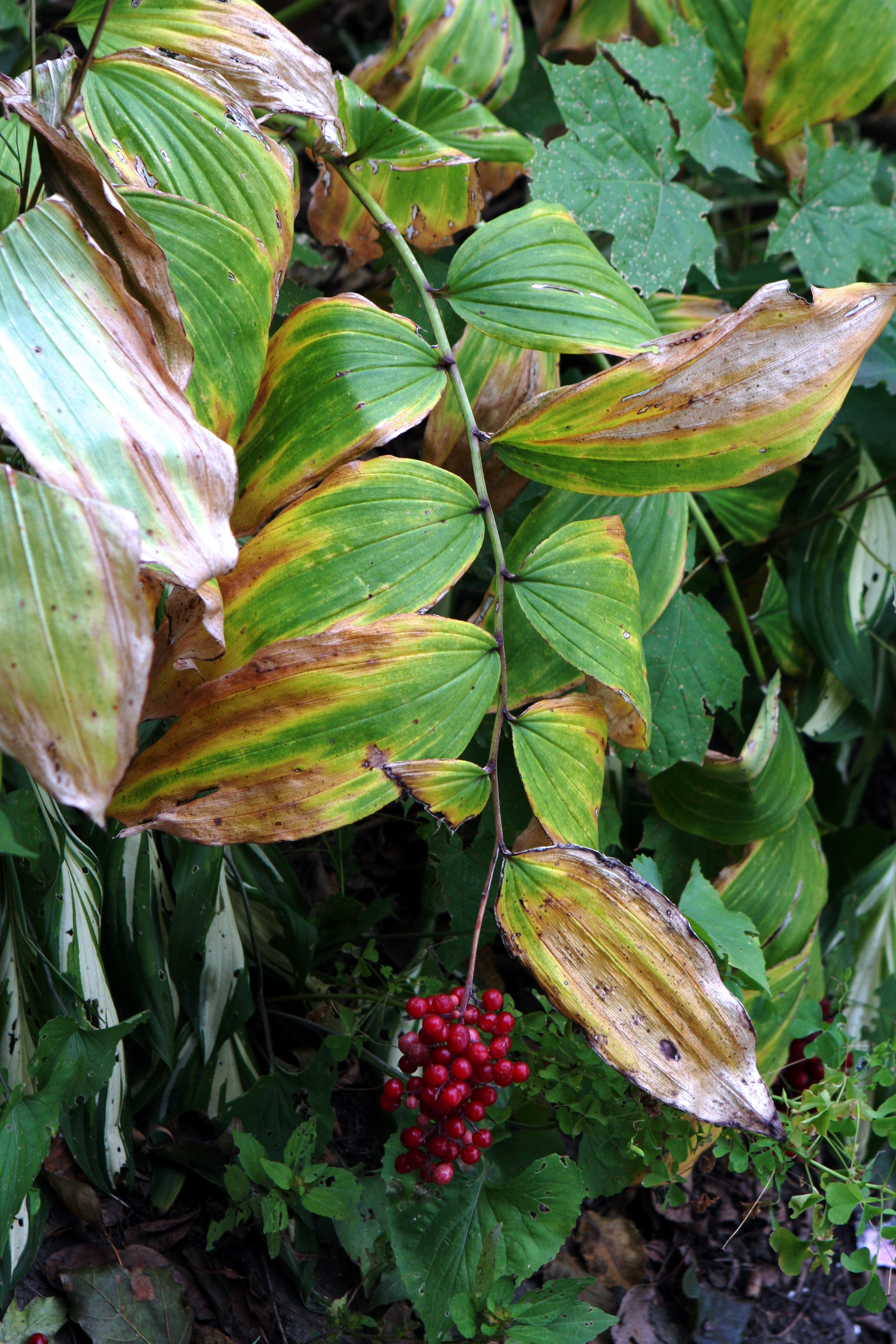
Ripe fruit

== See also ==
- Maianthemum stellatum, also known as false Solomon's seal
- Polygonatum biflorum, Solomon's seal
