= Hedwig Langecker =

Bohemian, Czech, and German pharmacologist

- Born: January 29, 1894; Bohemia, Austria-Hungary
- Died: January 31, 1989 (aged 95); Germany
- Education: German University in Prague
- Known for: Discovery of pharmacological properties of Polygonatum officinale and Polygonatum multiflorum, studies of steroid hormone biochemistry
- Scientific career
- Fields: Pharmacology
- Workplaces: German University in Prague, Free University of Berlin

Hedwig Langecker (29 January 1894 – 31 January 1989) was a Bohemian, Czech, and German pharmacologist known for her discovery of the pharmacological properties of Polygonatum officinale and Polygonatum multiflorum. She was also known for her studies of steroid hormone biochemistry and her prolific output, which included over 200 scientific articles and several textbooks. Her career began at the German University in Prague, where she earned her M.D. in 1920 and a Ph.D. in 1923, and was habilitated in 1926; Langecker then became a professor and served in that role until 1945. That year, she moved to the Free University of Berlin, where she was a professor until 1959 and an emerita professor until her death in 1989.
