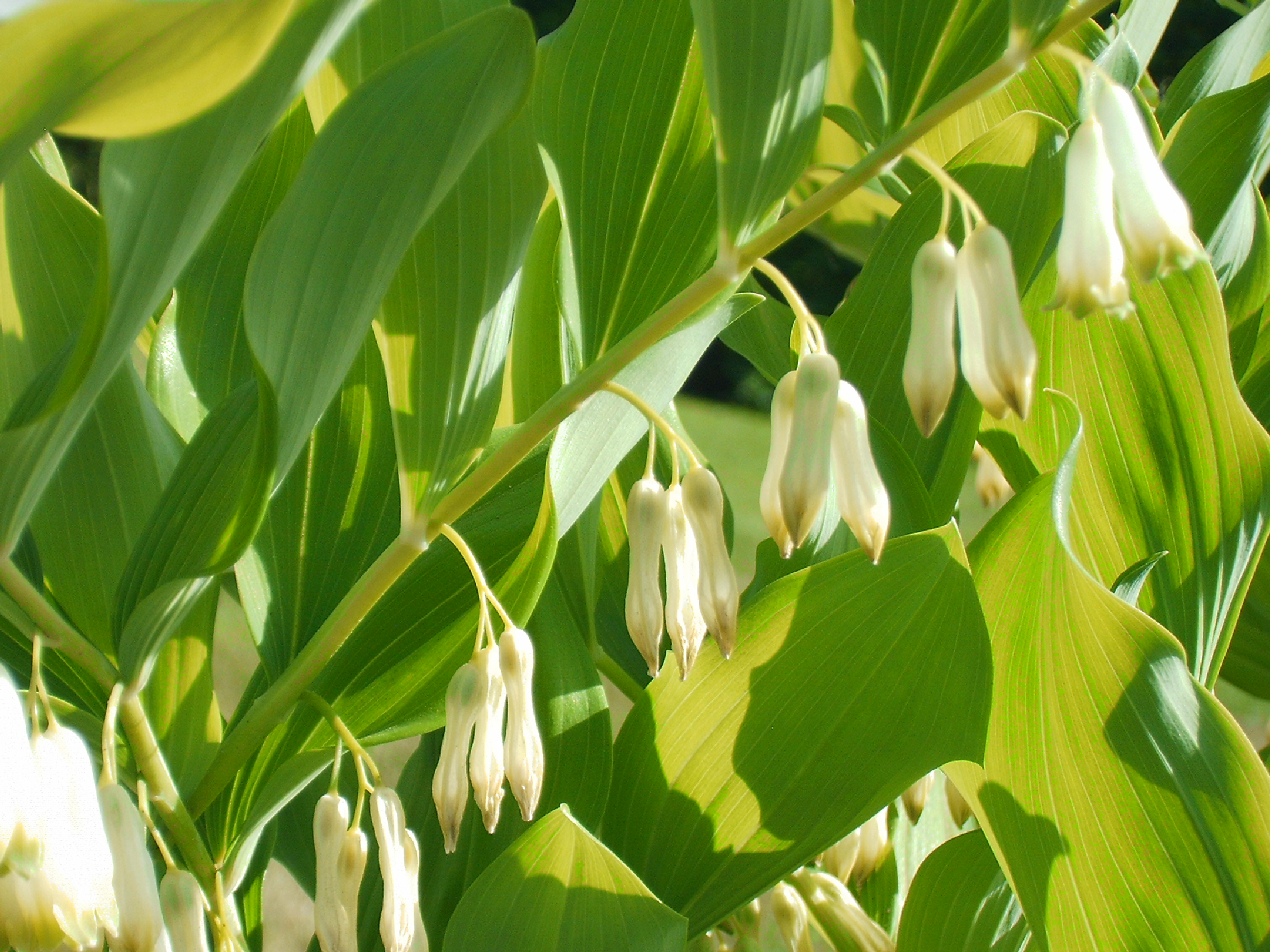

Scientific classification
- Kingdom: Plantae
- Clade: Tracheophytes
- Clade: Angiosperms
- Clade: Monocots
- Order: Asparagales
- Family: Asparagaceae
- Subfamily: Convallarioideae
- Genus: Polygonatum
- Species: P. × hybridum

Binomial name
- Polygonatum × hybridum Brügger

= Polygonatum × hybridum =

Species of flowering plant

Polygonatum × hybridum, the garden Solomon's-seal, is a hybrid flowering plant, which is a cross between common Solomon's-seal (Polygonatum multiflorum) and angular Solomon's-seal (Polygonatum odoratum).

The plant tends to be more vigorous than either of its parent species.

== Description ==
Like other members of the genus, Polygonatum × hybridum grows from rhizomes. The stems reach a height of about 1 m (3 ft), and carry pointed leaves arranged alternately. They arch over at the top so that the flowers, produced in Spring in small clusters at the junction between a leaf and the stem, hang downwards. Individual flowers are white with green tips and are slightly scented.

== Cultivation ==
Polygonatum × hybridum is suitable for sunny or partially shaded positions and is described as easy to grow. It is fully hardy, down to at least −20 °C (−4 °F). It has gained the Royal Horticultural Society's Award of Garden Merit. In gardens it is susceptible to attack by the larvae of Solomon's seal sawfly (Phymatocera aterrima), which feed on the underside of the leaves, rapidly reducing them to a skeletonised appearance.

Numerous cultivars are known:

- 'Striatum' has leaves which are striped and edged with cream to white markings. It is somewhat shorter at 60 cm (2 ft) than the normal form.
- 'Betberg' (named after the village of Betberg in Germany near to where it was found) has leaves which are initially dark brown, fading when flowering begins. It is taller than the normal form, reaching 1.2 m (4 ft).
