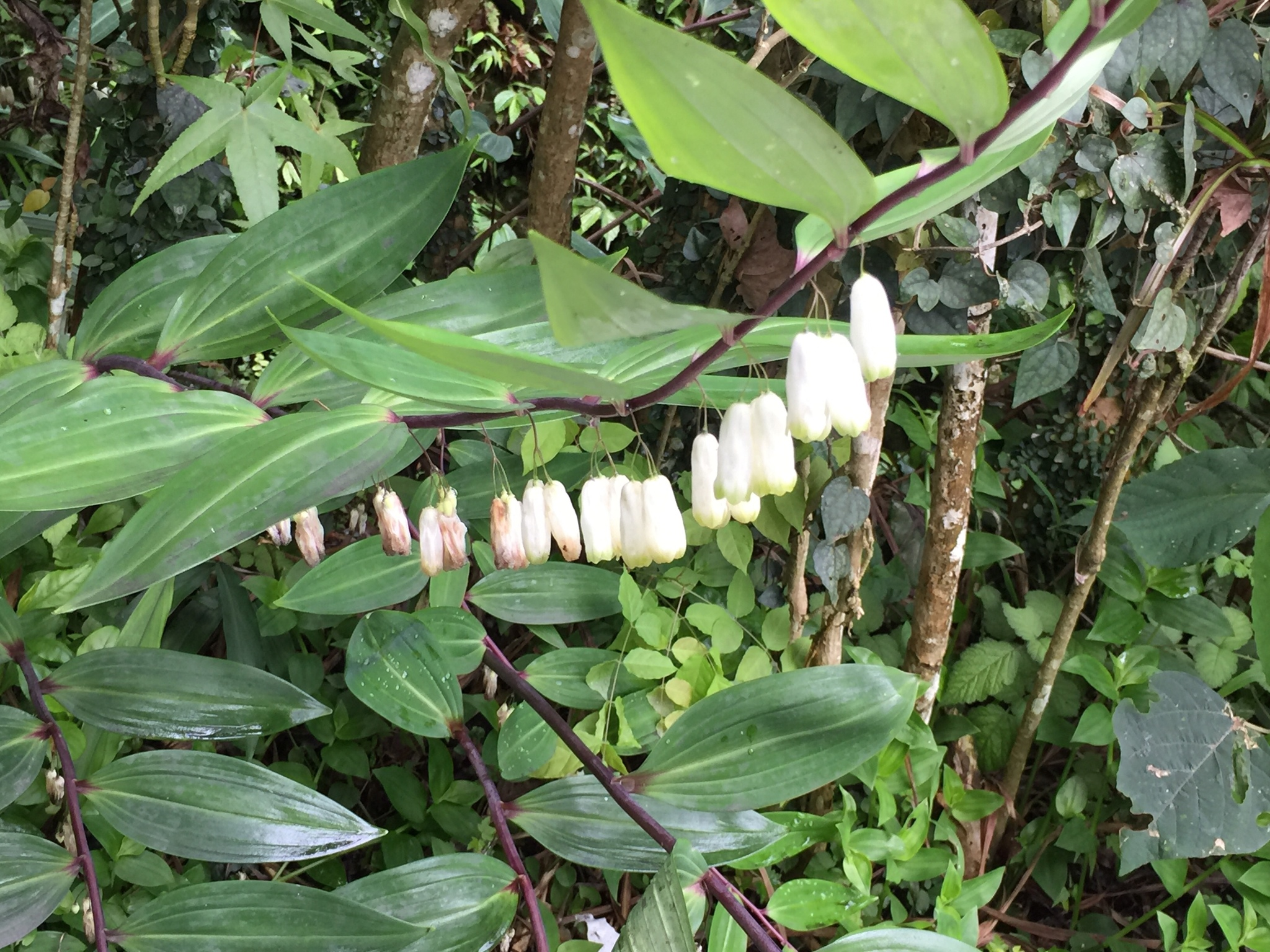

Scientific classification
- Kingdom: Plantae
- Clade: Tracheophytes
- Clade: Angiosperms
- Clade: Monocots
- Order: Asparagales
- Family: Asparagaceae
- Subfamily: Nolinoideae
- Genus: Polygonatum
- Species: P. arisanense

Binomial name
- Polygonatum arisanense Hay.

= Polygonatum arisanense =

Species of plant

Polygonatum arisanense is a flowering plant in the family Asparagaceae. The species is endemic to Taiwan and is found in areas around 1,500 meters in elevation. Its Chinese common name and the species epithet refer to the Alishan Range.
