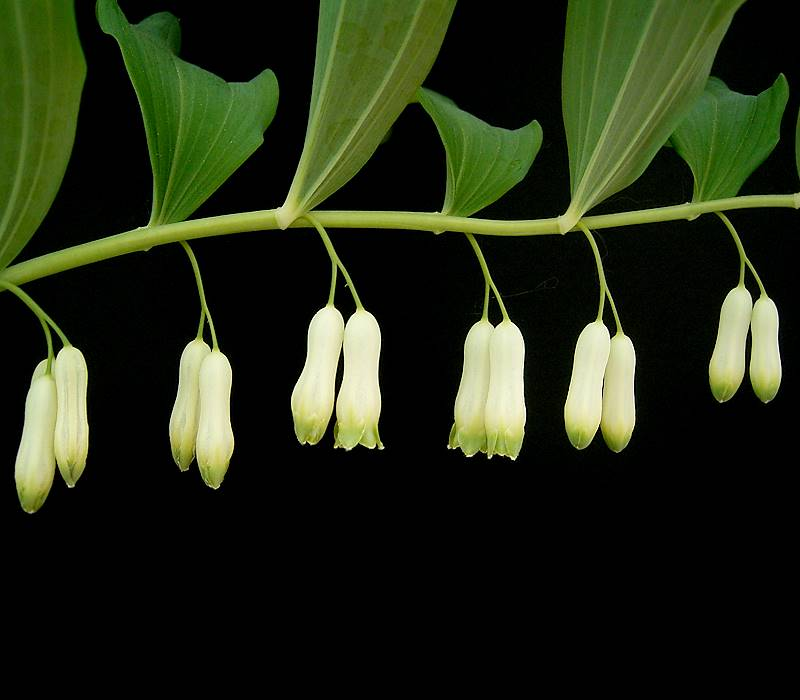
- Polygonatum multiflorum

Scientific classification
- Kingdom: Plantae
- Clade: Embryophytes
- Clade: Tracheophytes
- Clade: Angiosperms
- Clade: Monocots
- Order: Asparagales
- Family: Asparagaceae
- Subfamily: Convallarioideae
- Genus: Polygonatum; Mill.

Synonyms
- Axillaria Raf.; Salomonia Heist. ex Fabr.; Evallaria Neck.; Siphyalis Raf.; Codomale Raf.; Troxilanthes Raf.; Campydorum Salisb.; Sigillum Montandon in F.Friche-Joset; Periballanthus Franch. & Sav.

= Polygonatum =

Genus of flowering plants

Polygonatum /ˌpɒlɪˈɡɒnətəm/, also known as King Solomon's-seal, Solomon's seal, or sealwort, is a genus of flowering plants. In the APG III classification system, it is placed in the family Asparagaceae, subfamily Convallarioideae (formerly the family Ruscaceae). It has also been classified in the former family Convallariaceae and, like many lilioid monocots, was formerly classified in the lily family, Liliaceae. The genus is distributed throughout the temperate Northern Hemisphere. Most of the approximately 63 species occur in Asia, with 20 endemic to China.

== Etymology ==
Polygonatum comes from the ancient Greek for "many knees", referring to the multiple jointed rhizome. One explanation for the derivation of the common name "Solomon's seal" is that the roots bear depressions which resemble royal seals. Another is that the cut roots resemble Hebrew characters.

== Description ==
The fruits are red or black berries. The berries are poisonous to humans.

== Taxonomy ==
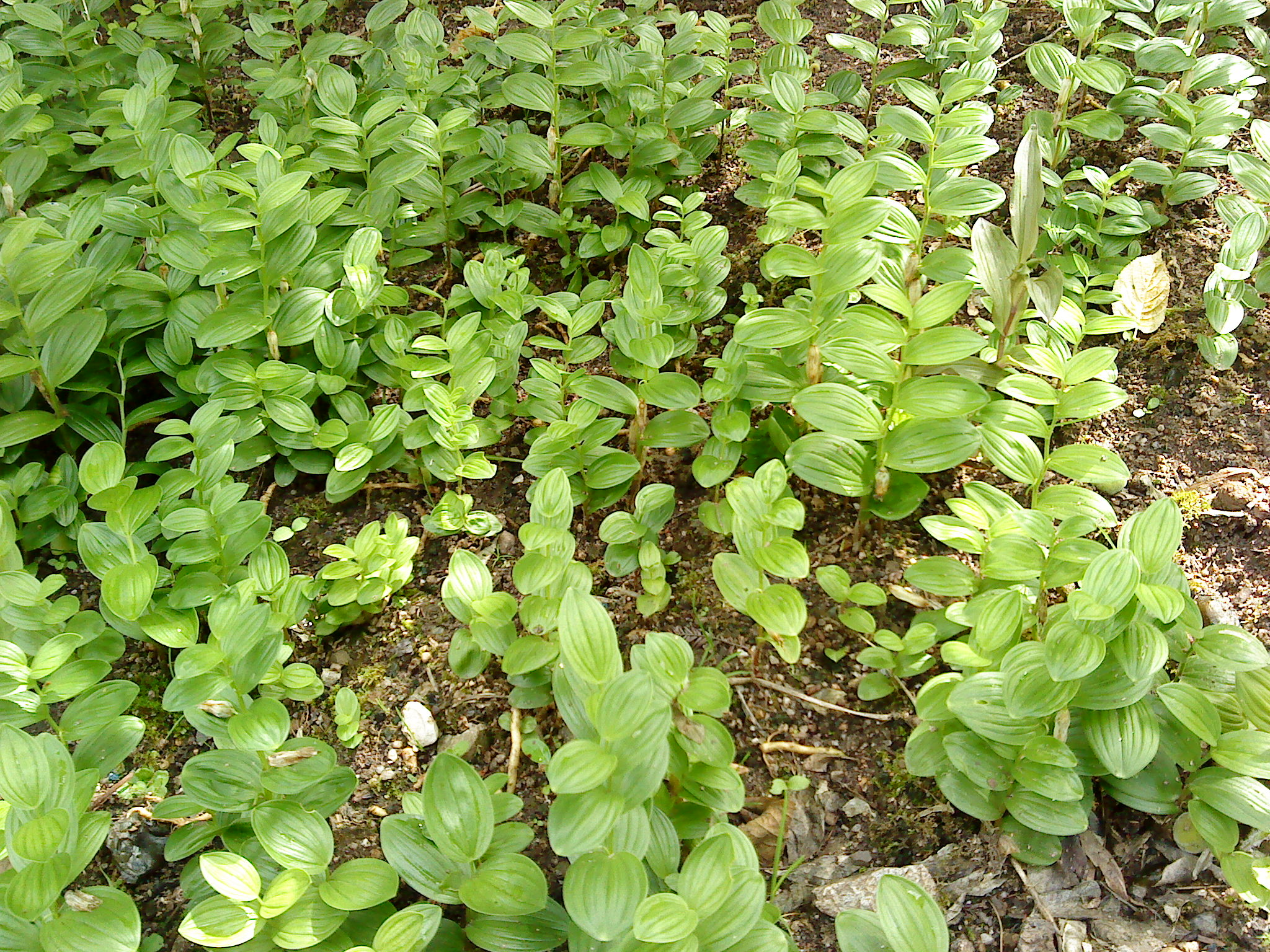
Polygonatum humile

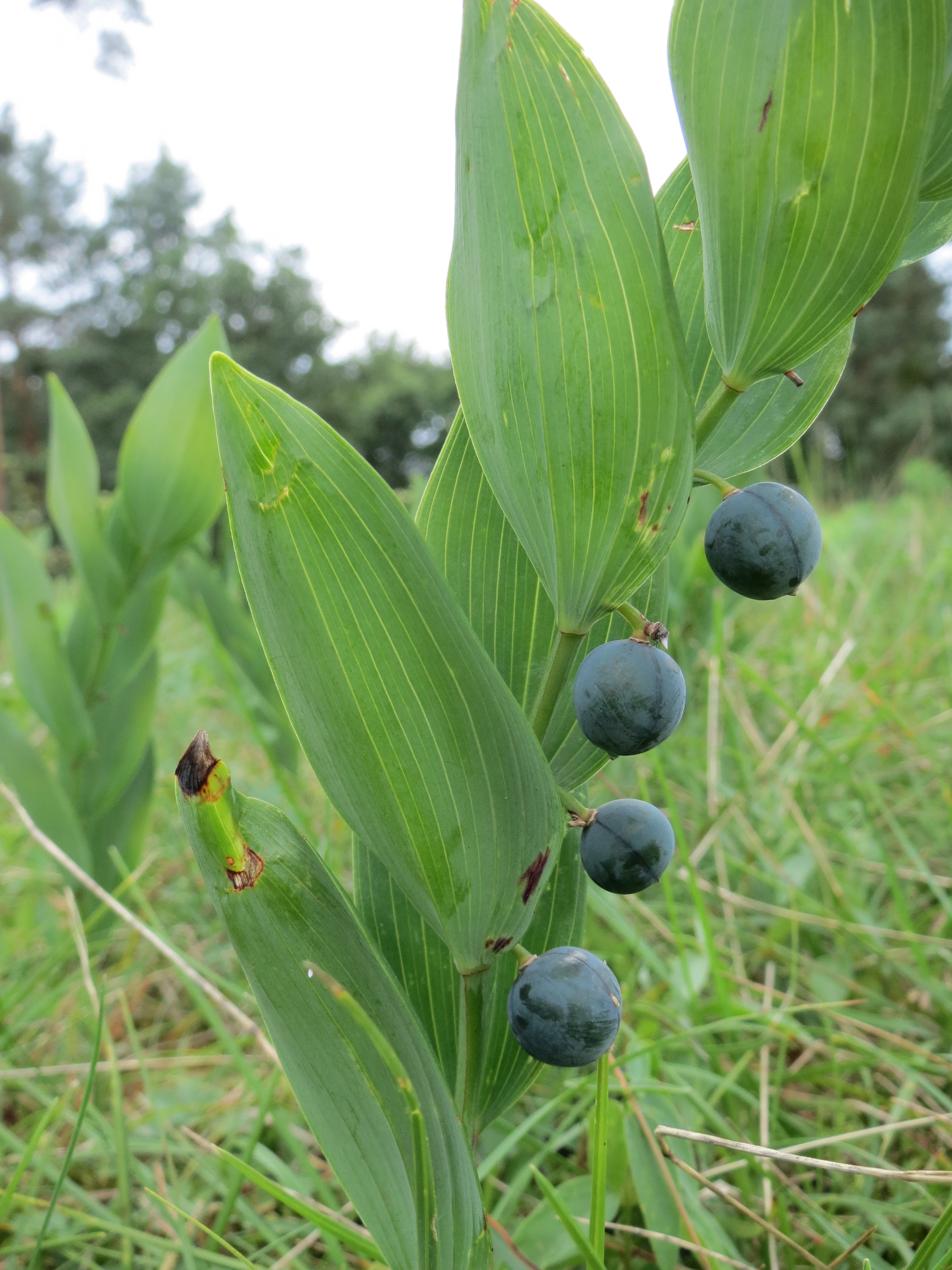
Fruit of Polygonatum odoratum

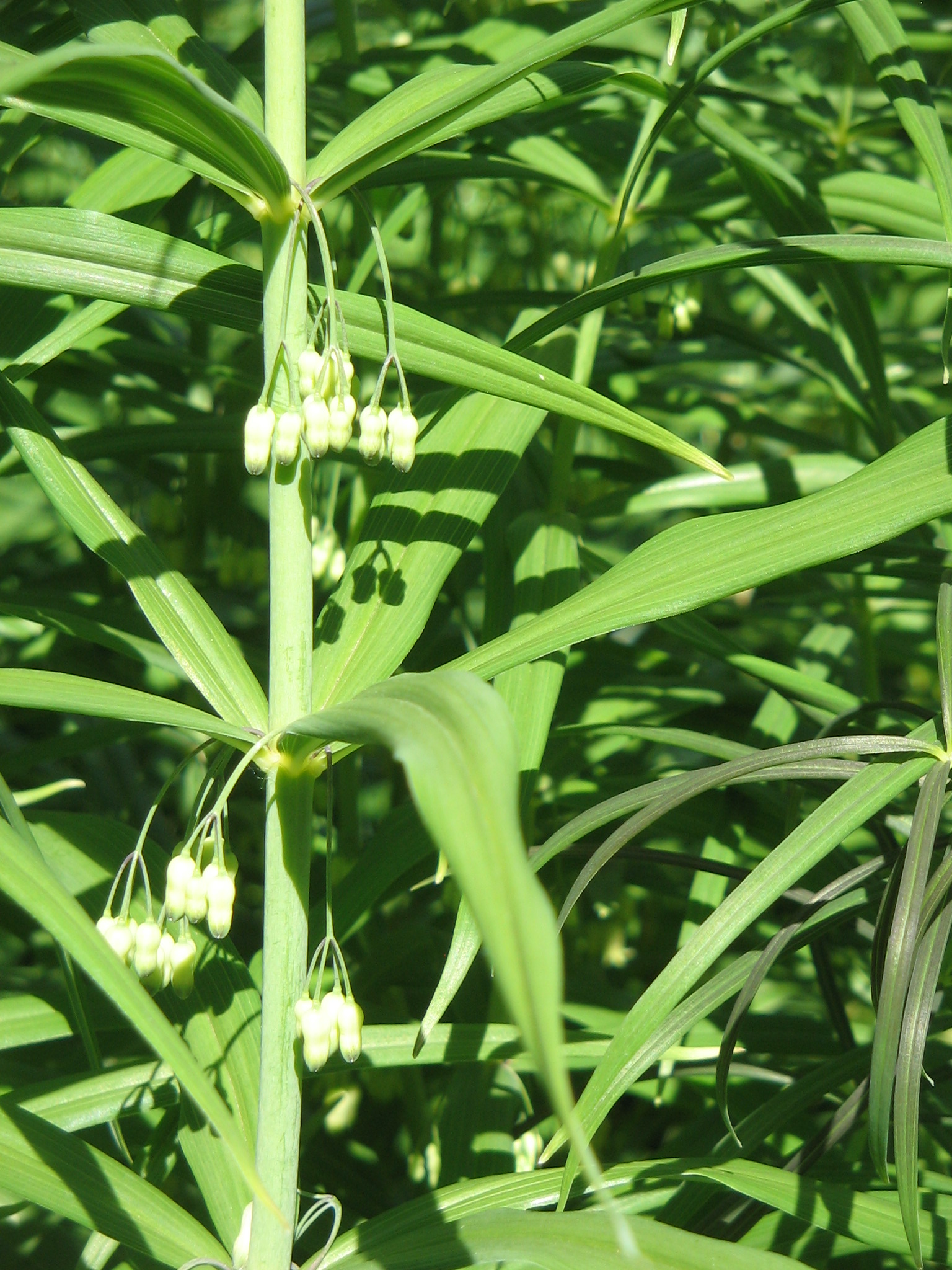
Polygonatum verticillatum

=== Species ===
The following species are recognised in the genus Polygonatum:

- Polygonatum acuminatifolium Kom.
- Polygonatum adnatum S.Yun Liang
- Polygonatum amabile Yatabe
- Polygonatum angelicum Floden
- Polygonatum annamense Floden
- Polygonatum arisanense Hayata
- Polygonatum autumnale Floden
- Polygonatum × azegamii (Ohwi) M.N.Tamura
- Polygonatum biflorum (Walter) Elliott (including Polygonatum commutatum) – Solomon's seal, smooth or great Solomon's seal – Eastern and central North America
- Polygonatum binatifolium S.R.Yi & H.X.Zhu
- Polygonatum brevistylum Baker
- Polygonatum × buschianum Tzvelev
- Polygonatum campanulatum G.W.Hu
- Polygonatum cathcartii Baker
- Polygonatum cirrhifolium (Wall.) Royle – tendril-leaf Solomon's seal – Southern China
- Polygonatum costatum Floden
- Polygonatum cryptanthum H.Lév. & Vaniot
- Polygonatum curvistylum Hua
- Polygonatum cyrtonema Hua – Solomon's seal – Eastern Asia
- Polygonatum daminense H.J.Yang & D.F.Cui
- Polygonatum × desoulavyi Kom.
- Polygonatum × domonense Satake
- Polygonatum falcatum A.Gray – Eastern Asia
- Polygonatum filipes Merr. ex C.Jeffrey & McEwan
- Polygonatum franchetii Hua
- Polygonatum geminiflorum Decne.
- Polygonatum glaberrimum K.Koch
- Polygonatum gongshanense L.H.Zhao & X.J.He
- Polygonatum govanianum Royle
- Polygonatum graminifolium Hook.
- Polygonatum grandicaule Y.S.Kim, B.U.Oh & C.G.Jang
- Polygonatum griffithii Baker
- Polygonatum hirtellum Hand.-Mazz.
- Polygonatum hookeri Baker
- Polygonatum humile Fisch. ex Maxim. – dwarf Solomon's seal – Eastern Asia
- Polygonatum × hybridum Brügger – garden Solomon's seal – Europe
- Polygonatum inflatum Kom. – Eastern Asia
- Polygonatum infundiflorum Y.S.Kim, B.U.Oh & C.G.Jang
- Polygonatum involucratum (Franch. & Sav.) Maxim. – Asia
- Polygonatum jinzhaiense D.C.Zhang & J.Z.Shao
- Polygonatum kingianum Collett & Hemsl. – Solomon's seal – Asia
- Polygonatum × krylovii (Ameljcz. & Malachova) A.L.Ebel
- Polygonatum lasianthum Maxim. – Korean Solomon's seal – Eastern Asia
- Polygonatum latifolium (Jacq.) Desf.
- Polygonatum leiboense S.C.Chen & D.Q.Liu
- Polygonatum longistylum Y.Wan ex C.Z.Gao
- Polygonatum luteoverrucosum Floden
- Polygonatum macranthum (Maxim.) Koidz.
- Polygonatum macropodum Turcz. – big footed Solomon's seal – Asia
- Polygonatum megaphyllum P.Y.Li
- Polygonatum mengtzense F.T.Wang & Tang
- Polygonatum multiflorum (L.) All. – (common) Solomon's seal – Europe
- Polygonatum nervulosum Baker
- Polygonatum nodosum Hua
- Polygonatum odoratum (Mill.) Druce – scented (or angular) Solomon's seal – Europe
- Polygonatum omeiense Z.Y.Zhu
- Polygonatum oppositifolium (Wall.) Royle
- Polygonatum orientale Desf. – oriental Solomon's seal – Western Asia, Eastern Europe
- Polygonatum prattii Baker
- Polygonatum × pseudopolyanthemum Miscz. ex Grossh.
- Polygonatum pubescens (Willd.) Pursh – downy/hairy Solomon's seal – Eastern North America
- Polygonatum punctatum Royle ex Kunth
- Polygonatum qinghaiense Z.L.Wu & Y.C.Yang
- Polygonatum robustum (Korsh.) Nakai
- Polygonatum roseum (Ledeb.) Kunth
- Polygonatum sewerzowii Regel
- Polygonatum sibiricum Redouté – Huang Jing, Siberian Solomon's seal – Eastern Asia
- Polygonatum singalilense H.Hara
- Polygonatum sparsifolium F.T.Wang & Tang
- Polygonatum stenophyllum Maxim.
- Polygonatum stewartianum Diels
- Polygonatum × tamaense H.Hara
- Polygonatum tessellatum F.T.Wang & Tang
- Polygonatum tsinlingense Tsui
- Polygonatum undulatifolium Floden
- Polygonatum urceolatum (J.M.H.Shaw) Floden
- Polygonatum verticillatum (L.) All. – whorled Solomon's seal – Europe
- Polygonatum wardii F.T.Wang & Tang
- Polygonatum yunnanense H.Lév.
- Polygonatum zanlanscianense Pamp.
- Polygonatum zhejiangensis X.J.Xue & H.Yao

== Uses ==
=== Gardening ===
Several species are valued as ornamental plants, including:

- Polygonatum biflorum
- Polygonatum hirtum
- Polygonatum hookeri
- Polygonatum humile
- Polygonatum × hybridum
- Polygonatum multiflorum
- Polygonatum odoratum
- Polygonatum stewartianum
- Polygonatum verticillatum

=== Food ===
The berries are poisonous to humans.

Many species have long been used as food in China, such as Polygonatum sibiricum. Leaves, stems, and rhizomes are used raw or cooked and served as a side dish with meat and rice. The rhizomes of two local species are eaten with chicken's or pig's feet during festivals. The rhizomes are used to make tea or soaked in wine or liquor to flavor the beverages. They are also fried with sugar and honey to make sweet snacks. The starchy rhizomes can be dried, ground, and added to flour to supplement food staples. The rhizome of P. sibiricum is pulped, boiled, strained, and thickened with barley flour to make a sweet liquid seasoning agent called tangxi. At times, people in China have relied on P. megaphyllum as a famine food.

The shoots of some Polygonatum can be boiled and used like asparagus. P. cirrifolium and P. verticillatum are used as leafy vegetables in India. The American species P. biflorum has a starchy root that was eaten like the potato and used as flour for bread.

P. sibiricum is used for a tea called dungulle in Korea.

=== Traditional medicine ===
The berries may be poisonous to humans.

The traditional use of Polygonatum in the treatment of diabetes was first observed in 1930 by Hedwig Langecker. After experiments, she concluded that it was effective in fighting nutritional hyperglycemia, though not that caused by adrenaline release, probably due to its glucokinin content.

P. verticillatum is used in Ayurveda as an aphrodisiac. It is also used to treat pain, fever, inflammation, allergy, and weakness.

An herbal remedy called rhizoma polygonati is a mix of Polygonatum species used in traditional Chinese medicine, where it is called huangjing or huangqing (simplified Chinese: 黄精; traditional Chinese: 黃精; pinyin: huángjīng). It is supposed to strengthen various organs and enhance the qi. Polygonatum is believed to be restorative to mental vitality, especially when the mind has been overworked, overstressed, or is in a state of exhaustion.

P. cyrtonema is a compound that is often used in Traditional Chinese Theory as a treatment for depression, which is thought to originate from problems in the liver and the kidney. Post Traumatic Stress Disorder, which is considered by TCT to be a form of depression is also sometimes treated with P. cyrtonema. There is some evidence that P. cyrtonema can inhibit Post Traumatic Stress by regulating oxidative stress and inflammation associated with the NLRP3 gene.

=== Toxicity ===
P. odoratum and P. prattii, among others, have been demonstrated to contain raphides, at least in their rhizomes. P. odoratum rhizomes only have scattered raphides in their cortex, whereas in P. prattii they are present more densely and throughout the rhizome. The rhizomes are housed in mucilage cells.

== See also ==
- Maianthemum

== Bibliography ==
- Liu, Yingjiao; Liu, Canhuang; Yu, Yafei; Xu, Bei; Gong, Limin; Zeng, Xiaoyan; Xiao, Lan; Cheng, Qilai; Liu, Tasi (2014-11-19). "Authentication of Polygonati Odorati Rhizoma and other two Chinese Materia Medica of the Liliaceae family by pharmacognosy technique with GC–MS analysis". Microscopy Research and Technique. 78 (2): 119–127. doi:10.1002/jemt.22453. eISSN 1097-0029. PMID 25408497.
