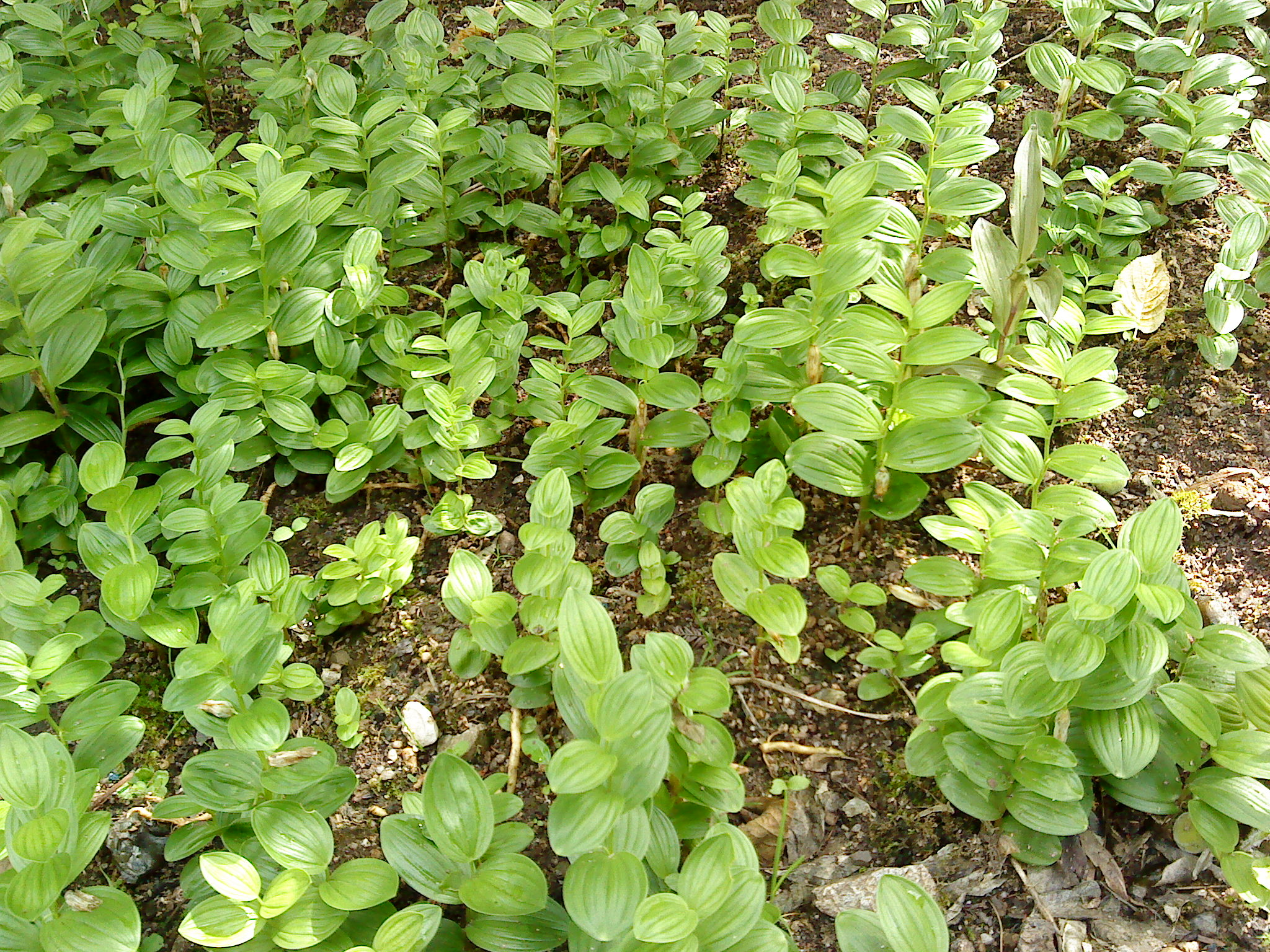

Scientific classification
- Kingdom: Plantae
- Clade: Tracheophytes
- Clade: Angiosperms
- Clade: Monocots
- Order: Asparagales
- Family: Asparagaceae
- Subfamily: Nolinoideae
- Genus: Polygonatum
- Species: P. humile

Binomial name
- Polygonatum humile (Fisch.) ex Maxim.

Synonyms
- Polygonatum humillimum Nakai; Polygonatum humile f. humillimum (Nakai) M.Kim; Polygonatum humile var. humillimum (Nakai) Y.N.Lee

= Polygonatum humile =

Dwarf Solomon's-seal

Species of flowering plant

Polygonatum humile, the dwarf Solomon's-seal, is a species of plant in the family Asparagaceae. The plant is said to possess scars on the rhizome that resemble the ancient Hebrew seal of King Solomon. This is a perennial species of the genus Polygonatum native to China, Japan, Kazakhstan, Korea, Mongolia and parts of Russia.
