= Jerome Alexander (chemist) =

American chemist

- Born: December 21, 1878; New York
- Died: January 18, 1959 (aged 80)
- Education: College of the City of New York
- Known for: Colloidal chemistry

Jerome Alexander (1876–1959) was an American chemist, a leading expert on colloidal chemistry and among the first American researchers to use an ultramicroscope.

== Life ==
Alexander was born in New York City on 21 December 1876 and studied at the College of the City of New York, graduating Master of Science in 1899. After working for a number of companies, in 1921 he set up independently as a consulting chemist and chemical engineer.

Alexander died on 18 January 1959. The archive of his correspondence is held by the New York Public Library.

== Publications ==
=== As author ===
Books

- Colloid Chemistry: An Introduction, with Some Practical Applications (1919)
- with others, Colloid Chemistry, Theoretical and Applied (1926)

Articles

- "Glue and Gelatin" and "Colloid Chemistry" in Roger's Industrial Chemistry (1912)
- "Albuminoids or Scleroproteins" in Allen's Commercial Organic Analysis (1913)
- "Colloid Chemistry" in Liddell's Handbook for Chemical Engineers (1920)

=== As translator ===
- Richard Zsigmondy, Colloids and the Ultramicroscope (1909)
