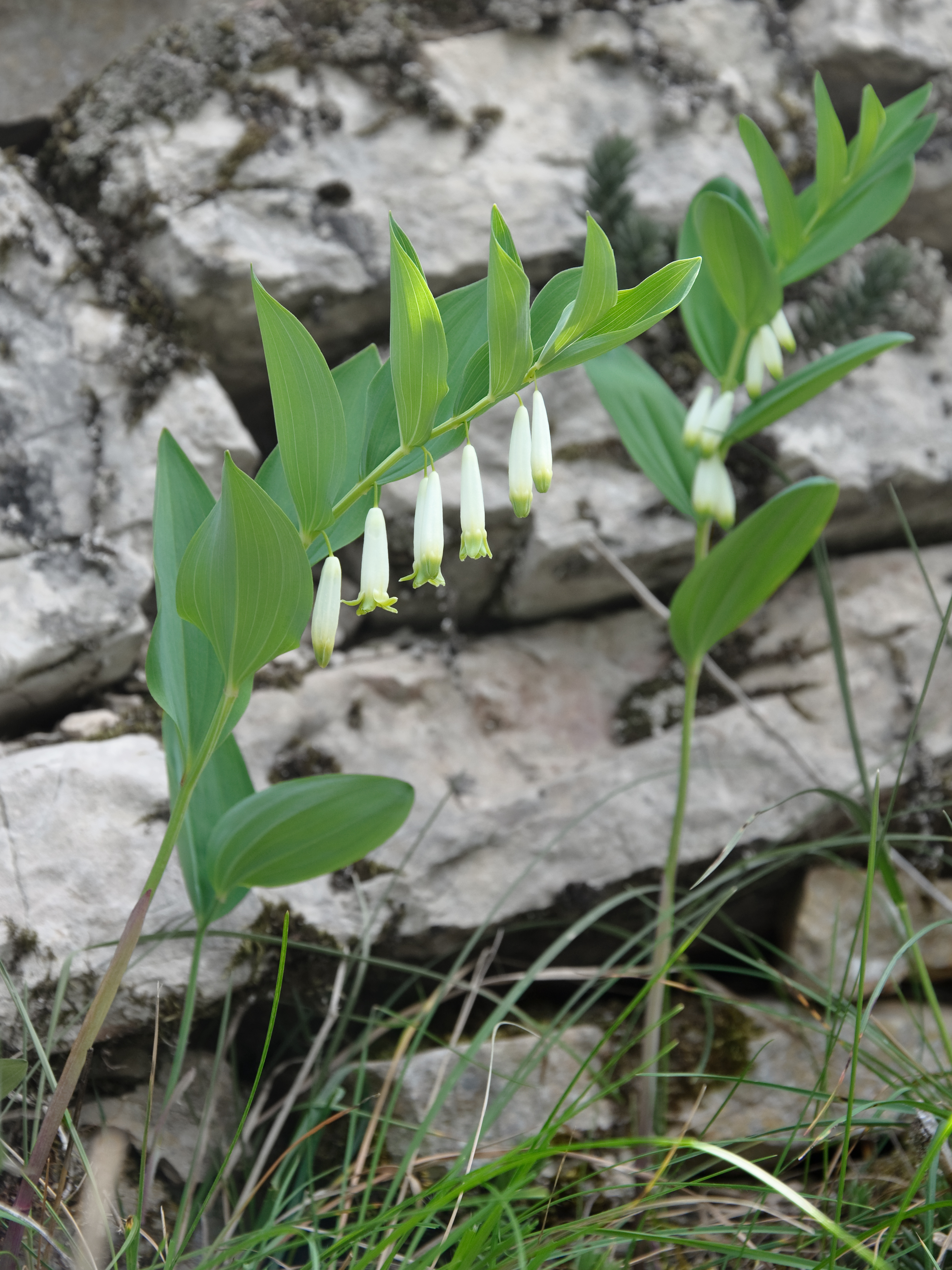

Scientific classification
- Kingdom: Plantae
- Clade: Tracheophytes
- Clade: Angiosperms
- Clade: Monocots
- Order: Asparagales
- Family: Asparagaceae
- Subfamily: Convallarioideae
- Genus: Polygonatum
- Species: P. odoratum

Binomial name
- Polygonatum odoratum (Mill.) Druce

Synonyms
- Convallaria odorata Mill.; Polygonatum sigillum Druce; Polygonatum maximowiczii F.Schmidt; Polygonatum hondoense Nakai ex Koidz.; Convallaria polygonatum L.; Convallaria angulosa Lam.; Polygonatum officinale All.; Polygonatum anceps Moench; Polygonatum vulgare Desf.; Convallaria parviflora Poir. in J.B.A.M.de Lamarck; Polygonatum obtusifolium Weinm.; Polygonatum ambiguum Link ex Schult. & Schult.f. in J.J.Roemer & J.A.Schultes; Convallaria compressa Steud.; Convallaria obtusifolia Günther ex Steud.; Polygonatum angulosum Montandon in F.Friche-Joset; Polygonatum simizui Kitag.; Polygonatum langyaense D.C.Zhang & J.Z.Shao; Polygonatum quelpaertense Ohwi; Polygonatum planifilum Kitag. & Hir.Takah.; Polygonatum thunbergii C.Morren & Decne.; Polygonatum japonicum C.Morren & Decne.

= Polygonatum odoratum =

Species of flowering plant

Polygonatum odoratum (syn. P. officinale), the angular Solomon's seal or scented Solomon's seal, is a species of flowering plant in the family Asparagaceae, native to Europe, the Caucasus, Siberia, the Russian Far East, China, Mongolia, Korea, Nepal and Japan. In the United Kingdom it is one of three native species of the genus, the others being P. multiflorum and P. verticillatum.

The genus name Polygonatum comes from the Greek words "poly", meaning "many", and "gonu", meaning "knee joint". This is in reference to the plant's jointed rhizomes. The Latin specific epithet odoratum means "scented".

== Description ==
Polygonatum odoratum is a colonizing herbaceous perennial growing to 85 cm (33 in) tall by 30 cm (12 in) wide, with alternate, simple leaves on arching stems. The scented tubular flowers are white with green tips, borne in spring and hanging from the underside of the stems.

Its fruit persists for an average of 68.4 days, and bears an average of 2.6 seeds per fruit. Fruits average 80.9% water, and their dry weight includes 21.9% carbohydrates and 1.7% lipids.

== Cultivation ==
Polygonatum odoratum, like its relative lily of the valley, is cultivated in moist, shaded situations, where it will spread by underground stolons. Cultivars include 'Flore pleno' and 'Variegatum'.

== Use ==
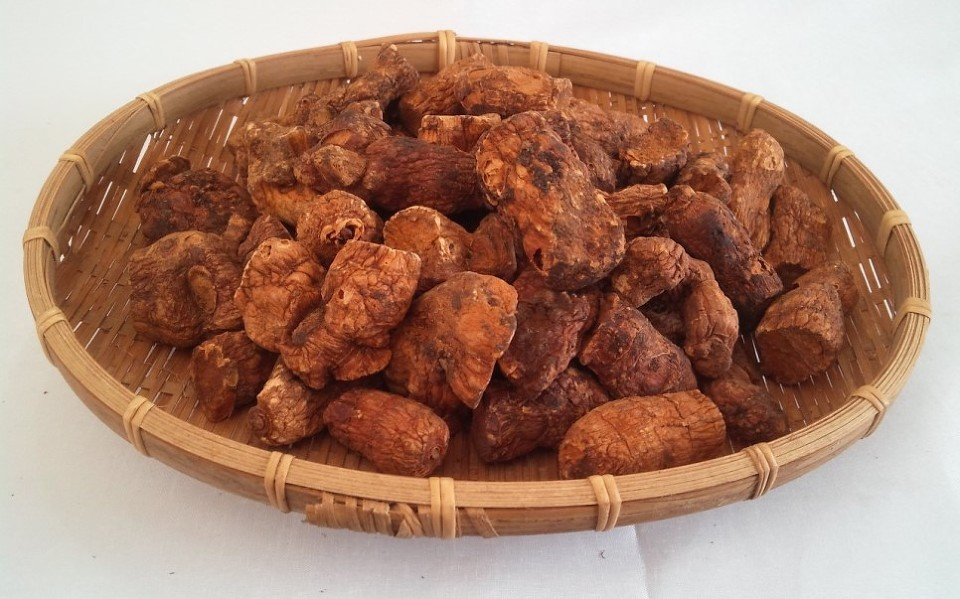
Dunggulle (lesser Solomon's seal roots

Polygonatum odoratum is used in traditional Chinese medicine and Traditional Korean medicine, where it is called yùzhú (玉竹) and dunggulle (둥굴레) respectively. In Korea, the root of the plant is used to make tea.

This plant species is described in the work Plantas Medicinales (medicinal plants) of Pius Font i Quer. According to it, its rhizome contains asparagine, mucilage, a cardio-tonic glycoside, saponin, and quinine gluconate. It has been used for intestinal problems and pain, for rheumatism, gout, water retention, and as a diuretic. He says that the scientific medicine has used it to treat diabetes. He also describes a digestive liquor that uses the rhizome of this plant.

The young shoots of the plants may be boiled and served like asparagus. The stems, leaves, and berries, however, must be treated with caution, as they are thought to be toxic if consumed in large quantities.

=== Safety ===
Its rhizome contains scattered raphides, but only in the cortex (outer layer).

== Varieties ==
Four varieties are recognized:

- Polygonatum odoratum var. maximowiczii (F.Schmidt) Koidz. – Japan, Russian Far East
- Polygonatum odoratum var. odoratum – widespread from Portugal and Great Britain to Japan and Kamchatka
- Polygonatum odoratum var. pluriflorum (Miq.) Ohwi – Japan, Korea
- Polygonatum odoratum var. thunbergii (C.Morren & Decne.) H.Hara – Japan, Korea

== Bibliography ==
- Liu, Yingjiao; Liu, Canhuang; Yu, Yafei; Xu, Bei; Gong, Limin; Zeng, Xiaoyan; Xiao, Lan; Cheng, Qilai; Liu, Tasi (2014-11-19). "Authentication of Polygonati Odorati Rhizoma and other two Chinese Materia Medica of the Liliaceae family by pharmacognosy technique with GC–MS analysis". Microscopy Research and Technique. 78 (2). doi:10.1002/jemt.22453. eISSN 1097-0029.
- Ehrlén, Johan; Eriksson, Ove (1991). "Phenological variation in fruit characteristics in vertebrate-dispersed plants". Oecologia. 86 (4): 463–470. doi:10.1007/BF00318311. ISSN 0029-8549.
