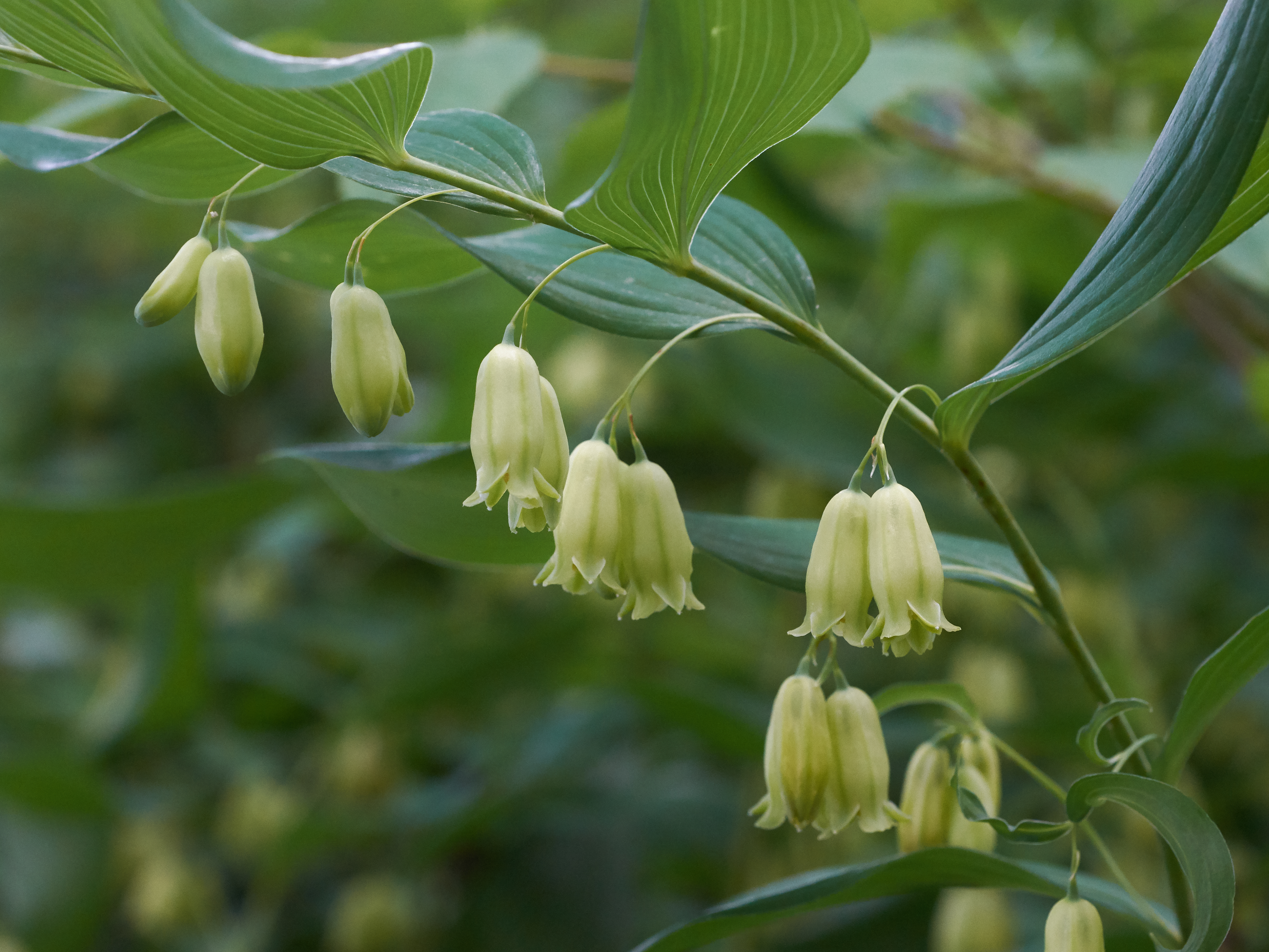

Conservation status
- Secure (NatureServe)

Scientific classification
- Kingdom: Plantae
- Clade: Embryophytes
- Clade: Tracheophytes
- Clade: Spermatophytes
- Clade: Angiosperms
- Clade: Monocots
- Order: Asparagales
- Family: Asparagaceae
- Subfamily: Convallarioideae
- Genus: Polygonatum
- Species: P. biflorum

Binomial name
- Polygonatum biflorum (Walt.) Ell.

Synonyms
- Convallaria angustifolia (Pursh) Poir.; Convallaria biflora Walter; Convallaria canaliculata Willd.; Convallaria commutata Schult. & Schult.f.; Polygonatum angustifolium Pursh; Polygonatum canaliculatum (Willd.) Pursh; Polygonatum cobrense (Wooton & Standl.) R.R.Gates; Polygonatum commutatum (Schult. & Schult.f.) A.Dietr.; Polygonatum ellipticum Farw.; Polygonatum giganteum A.Dietr.; Polygonatum hebetifolium (R.R.Gates) Bush; Polygonatum latifolium Pursh nom. illeg.; Polygonatum melleum Farw.; Polygonatum ovatum (Farw.) Bush; Polygonatum parviflorum A.Dietr.; Polygonatum virginicum Greene; Salomonia biflora (Walter) Britton; Salomonia cobrensis Wooton & Standl.; Salomonia commutata (Schult. & Schult.f.) Britton; Salomonia commutatum (Schult. f.) Farw.; Sigillaria angustifolia (Pursh) Raf.; Sigillaria biflora (Walter) Raf.; Sigillaria canaliculata (Willd.) Raf.; Sigillaria elliptica Raf.

= Polygonatum biflorum =

Smooth Solomon's-seal

Species of flowering plant

Polygonatum biflorum (smooth Solomon's-seal, great Solomon's-seal, Solomon's seal) is an herbaceous flowering plant native to eastern and central North America. The plant is said to possess scars on the rhizome that resemble the ancient Hebrew seal of King Solomon. It is often confused with Maianthemum racemosum (called "Solomon's plume" or "false Solomon's seal"), which has upright flowers.

== Description ==
Solomon's seal has arching, unbranched leaf stalks that are usually 90 centimetres (3.0 ft) long, but can reach up to 1.8 metres (5.9 ft) long. Leaves are simple and alternate with prominent, parallel veins. Between March and June, clusters of small white-green flowers droop from the stalks and later produce small blue berries. If dug up, the scars resembling Solomon's Seal may be visible on the nodes between sections of rhizomes. It is found in rich or rocky woods and along streambanks. It prefers shade to partial shade and medium to wet soil with high humus content, but can do well in a variety of conditions.

== Taxonomy ==
The species name biflorum is the neuter form of Latin biflorus, meaning "having two flowers". Despite the name, the flower clusters often have more than two flowers.

P. biflorum is now regarded as including a number of other species and varieties, e.g. P. biflorum var. commutatum or P. commutatum.

== Uses ==
Historically, the Native Americans consumed the starch-rich rhizomes of smooth Solomon's-seal as a "potato-like food" used to make breads and soups. The young shoots are also edible, raw or boiled for an asparagus-like food. Smooth Solomon's-seal was also used in herbal medicine. For example, the rhizome was used in making a tonic for gout and rheumatism. Smooth Solomon's-seal has had nearly a dozen uses in herbal medicine including as an anti-inflammatory, sedative, and tonic. Smooth Solomon's-seal is not used in large-scale agriculture.
