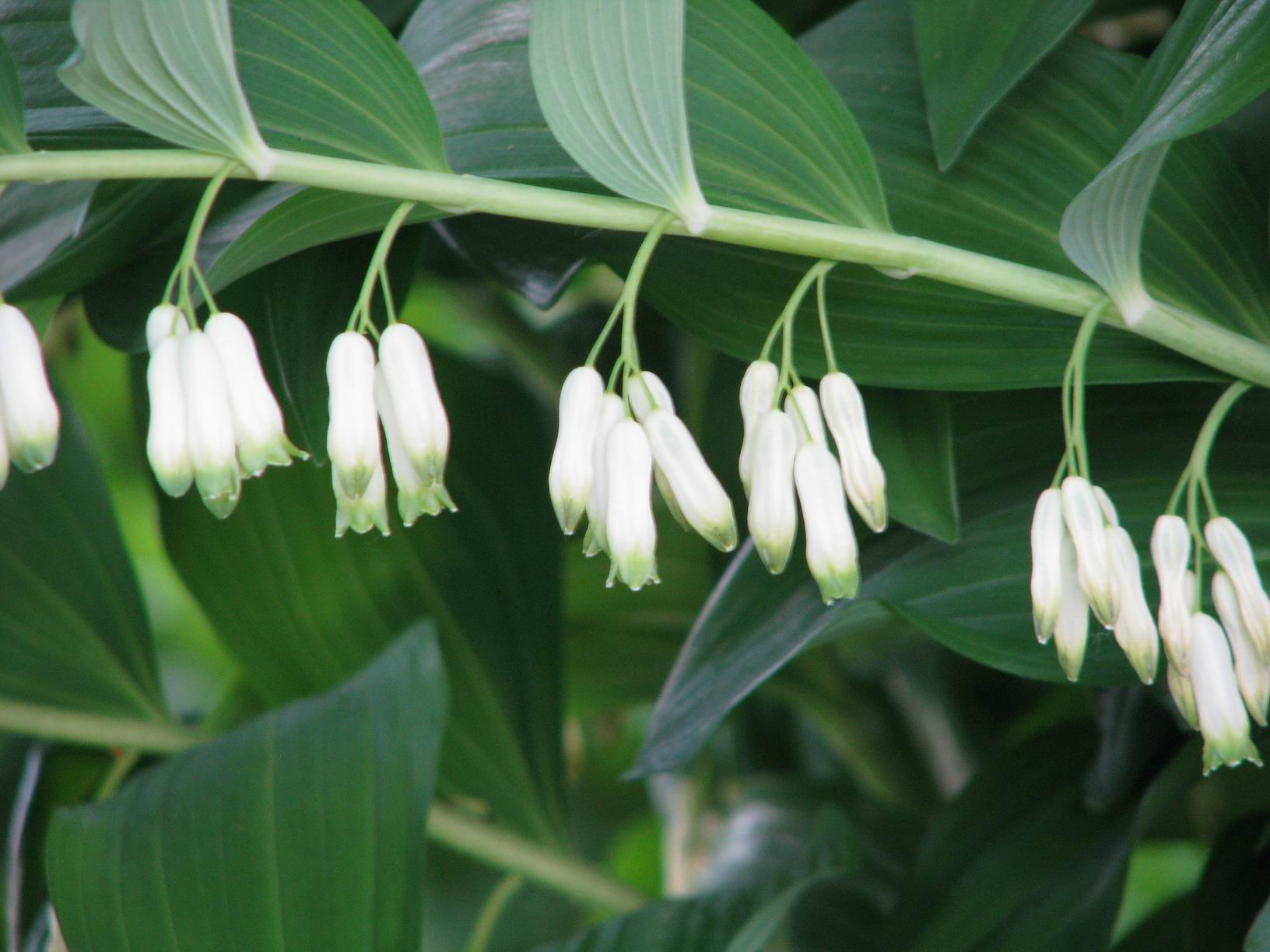
- Polygonatum multiflorum

Scientific classification
- Kingdom: Plantae
- Clade: Tracheophytes
- Clade: Angiosperms
- Clade: Monocots
- Order: Asparagales
- Family: Asparagaceae
- Subfamily: Convallarioideae
- Genus: Polygonatum
- Species: P. multiflorum

Binomial name
- Polygonatum multiflorum (L.) All.

= Polygonatum multiflorum =

Species of flowering plant

Polygonatum multiflorum, the Solomon's seal, David's harp, ladder-to-heaven or Eurasian Solomon's seal, is a species of flowering plant in the family Asparagaceae, native to Europe and temperate Asia. In Britain it is one of three native species of the genus, the others being P. odoratum and P. verticillatum.

== Name ==
The specific epithet multiflorum means "many-flowered".

== Description ==
It is a rhizomatous perennial growing to 90 cm (35 in) tall by 25 cm (10 in) broad, with arching stems of alternate leaves, and slightly necked, pendent tubular white flowers with green tips, hanging from the undersides of the stems. It is valued in cultivation for its ability to colonise shady areas, and is suitable for a woodland style planting.

Its fruit persists for an average of 17.5 days, and bears an average of 2.6 seeds per fruit. Fruits average 83.5% water, and their dry weight includes 43.6% carbohydrates and 1.2% lipids.

== Cultivation ==
The shoots of Polygonatum multiflorum look very attractive, so they are suitable for use in floral arrangements. The longevity of cut shoots of Polygonatum multiflorum ‘Variegatum’ harvested from the field ranges from 15 to 22 days. To extend the life of cut shoots, gibberellic acid, benzyladenine (BA) and hydroxyquinoline sulphate are used. They prolong postharvest longevity mainly by delaying leaf yellowing.

The hybrid Polygonatum × hybridum (P. multiflorum × P. odoratum) has gained the Royal Horticultural Society's Award of Garden Merit.

== Bibliography ==
- Matthew Wood. The Book of Herbal Wisdom. Random House, 1997. ISBN 978-1-55643-232-3; pp. 397–408
- Ehrlén, Johan; Eriksson, Ove (1991). "Phenological variation in fruit characteristics in vertebrate-dispersed plants". Oecologia. 86 (4): 463–470. doi:10.1007/BF00318311. ISSN 0029-8549.
