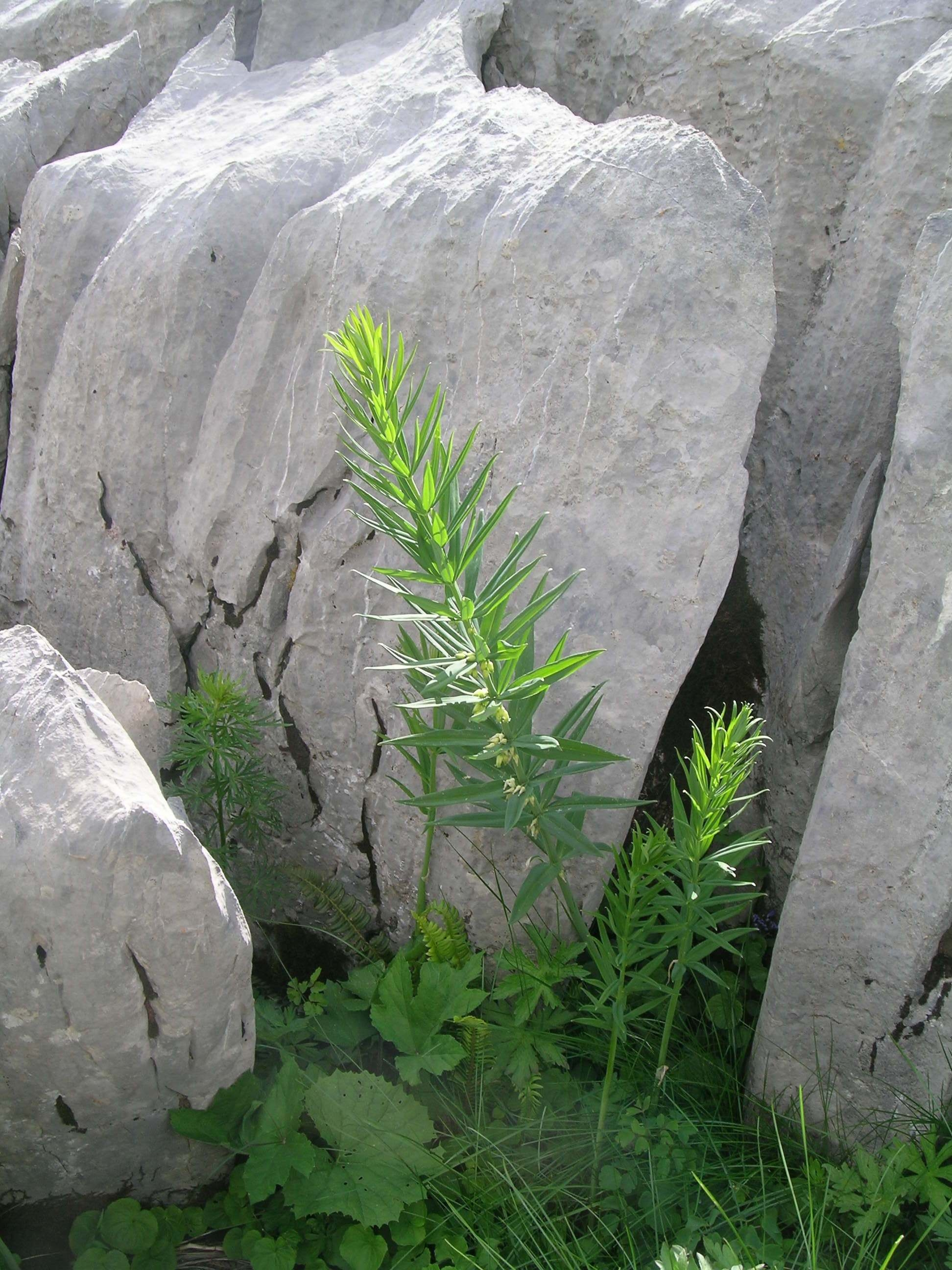

Scientific classification
- Kingdom: Plantae
- Clade: Tracheophytes
- Clade: Angiosperms
- Clade: Monocots
- Order: Asparagales
- Family: Asparagaceae
- Subfamily: Convallarioideae
- Genus: Polygonatum
- Species: P. verticillatum

Binomial name
- Polygonatum verticillatum (L.) All.

Synonyms
- Campydorum verticillatum (L.) Salisb. nom. inval.; Convallaria leptophylla D.Don; Convallaria stellifolia Peterm.; Convallaria verticillata L.; Evallaria verticillata (L.) Neck. nom. inval.; Polygonatum angustifolium Bubani nom. illeg.; Polygonatum erythrocarpum Hua; Polygonatum jacquemontianum Kunth; Polygonatum kansuense Maxim. ex Batalin; Polygonatum leptophyllum (D.Don) Royle; Polygonatum macrophyllum Sweet; Polygonatum minutiflorum H.Lèv.; Polygonatum roseum Hook. nom. illeg.; Sigillum verticillatum (L.) Montandon; Troxilanthes angustifolia Raf.

= Polygonatum verticillatum =

Whorled Solomon's-seal

Species of flowering plant

Polygonatum verticillatum or whorled Solomon's-seal is a plant species of the genus Polygonatum. It is widespread in Europe and also in China and the Himalayas though not reported from large sections of western and Central Asia in between those two ranges.
