= Maianthemum comaltepecense =

Scientific classification
- Kingdom: Plantae
- Clade: Embryophytes
- Clade: Tracheophytes
- Clade: Angiosperms
- Clade: Monocots
- Order: Asparagales
- Family: Asparagaceae
- Subfamily: Convallarioideae
- Genus: Maianthemum
- Species: M. comaltepecense

Binomial name
- Maianthemum comaltepecense Espejo, López-Ferr. & Ceja

Species of flowering plant

Maianthemum comaltepecense is a rare perennial, terrestrial herb found as an understory species in moist forests and endemic to southwest Mexico.

== Description ==
Plants grow 10–30 cm (4–12 in) tall from branching rhizomes with roots only at the nodes. Stems are hairless, recurved and flexuous.

=== Leaves ===
Plants have 4 or 5 (sometimes 6) leaves that are sessile or short stalked. Leaf blades are 3–8.5 cm (1–3 in) long by 1–3 cm (0–1 in) wide and lance- to egg-shaped with pointed tips and rounded bases.

=== Flowering clusters ===
4 to 12 flowers are set on a compound raceme with 1 or 2 flowers per node. The raceme is 1.5 to 4.5 cm long and flexuous.

=== Flowers and fruits ===
Information on flower size and color not available. Fruits are 3-lobed, 6–9 mm across, ripening to purple with white spots.

== Distribution ==
Maianthemum comaltepecense is known only from one population in Oaxaca, Mexico.

== Habitat and ecology ==
Found growing in moist, shaded oak forests at 2,900 m (9,500 ft). Mosses, lichens and ferns abundant.

== Similar species ==
The complex raceme of Maianthemum comaltepecense, with 2 flowers at some nodes, is similar to that of Maianthemum canadense and Maianthemum dilatatum, however the leaves are quite different and the distributions are well separated. Maianthemum scilloideum is similar and also found in Mexico, but plants are more robust, generally have 8 to 12 leaves per stem and the fruits are usually spherical and red at maturity.
