= Two-leaved Solomon's seal =

Two-leaved Solomon's seal is a common name for several plants and may refer to:

- Maianthemum canadense, native to Canada and the northeastern United States
- Maianthemum dilatatum, native to western North America and Asia
