= Maianthemum monteverdense =

Scientific classification
- Kingdom: Plantae
- Clade: Tracheophytes
- Clade: Angiosperms
- Clade: Monocots
- Order: Asparagales
- Family: Asparagaceae
- Subfamily: Nolinoideae
- Genus: Maianthemum
- Species: M. monteverdense

Binomial name
- Maianthemum monteverdense LaFrankie

Species of flowering plant

Maianthemum monteverdense is a perennial flowering plant of restricted distribution. It grows as an epiphyte on trees in high cloud forests of 1600 m + elevation from Nicaragua to Costa Rica.

== Description ==
Plants grow 60–85 cm (24–33 in) tall. Roots grow uniformly along forked rhizomes that are 4–6 cm (2–2 in) wide. Stems are arching and leafy; usually with 12-16 leaves set 4–8 cm (2–3 in) apart (closer near the top of the plant).

=== Leaves ===
Leaves usually clasp the stalk or sometimes have a short, 1–2 mm long petiole. Leaf blades are egg- to lance-shaped with pointed tips and rounded bases 13–15 cm (5–6 in) long by 9–10 cm (4–4 in) wide and with flat (not wavy) edges. Veins are prominent and the leaf surface is hairless and shiny.

=== Flowering clusters ===
Forty to 60 flowers are set on a branched flowering stalk (panicle). The main axis of the panicle is usually 15–20 cm long, pendent and slightly flexuous. It is hairless, shiny and light green. The side branches of the panicle are short, spreading, set at about 1–2 cm intervals along the main axis and are arranged in a helix. Each side branch has 4-6 flowers, set on 1–2.5 cm long stalks (pedicels).

=== Flowers and fruits ===
The flowers are cup-shaped and made up of yellow-green tepals 5-5.5 mm long and 2 mm wide. Stamens are inserted at the base of the tepals. Fruits are 3-lobed, 10–12 mm across, green ripening to red. Flowering occurs from December to February and fruits remain on the plant into August.

== Distribution ==
Found in Costa Rica from the provinces of Alajuela, Cartago, Guanacaste, and Puntarenas and in Nicaragua from Jinotega departmento.

== Habitat and ecology ==
Maianthemum monteverdense is an epiphyte that grows on canopy trees of cloud forests, but will persist in blow-downs under an open canopy. It is generally found at sites from 1600 to 1700 m elevation, but has been found at sites below 1000 m elevation in Nicaragua and up to 2300 m in Costa Rica.

== Similar species ==
Maianthemum monteverdense is similar to Maianthemum amoenum. Both are epiphytes of cloud forests, but M. amoenum is a smaller plant with a shorter, erect flowering panicle with a red rather than green central axis.

== Bibliography ==
LaFrankie (October 1986). "Morphology and taxonomy of the new world species of Maianthemum (Liliaceae)". Journal of the Arnold Arboretum. 67 (4): 371–439. doi:10.5962/bhl.part.27393.
