= Swanton Novers Woods =

UK Site of Special Scientific Interest

Coordinates: 52.844°N 0.979°E

- Site of Special Scientific Interest
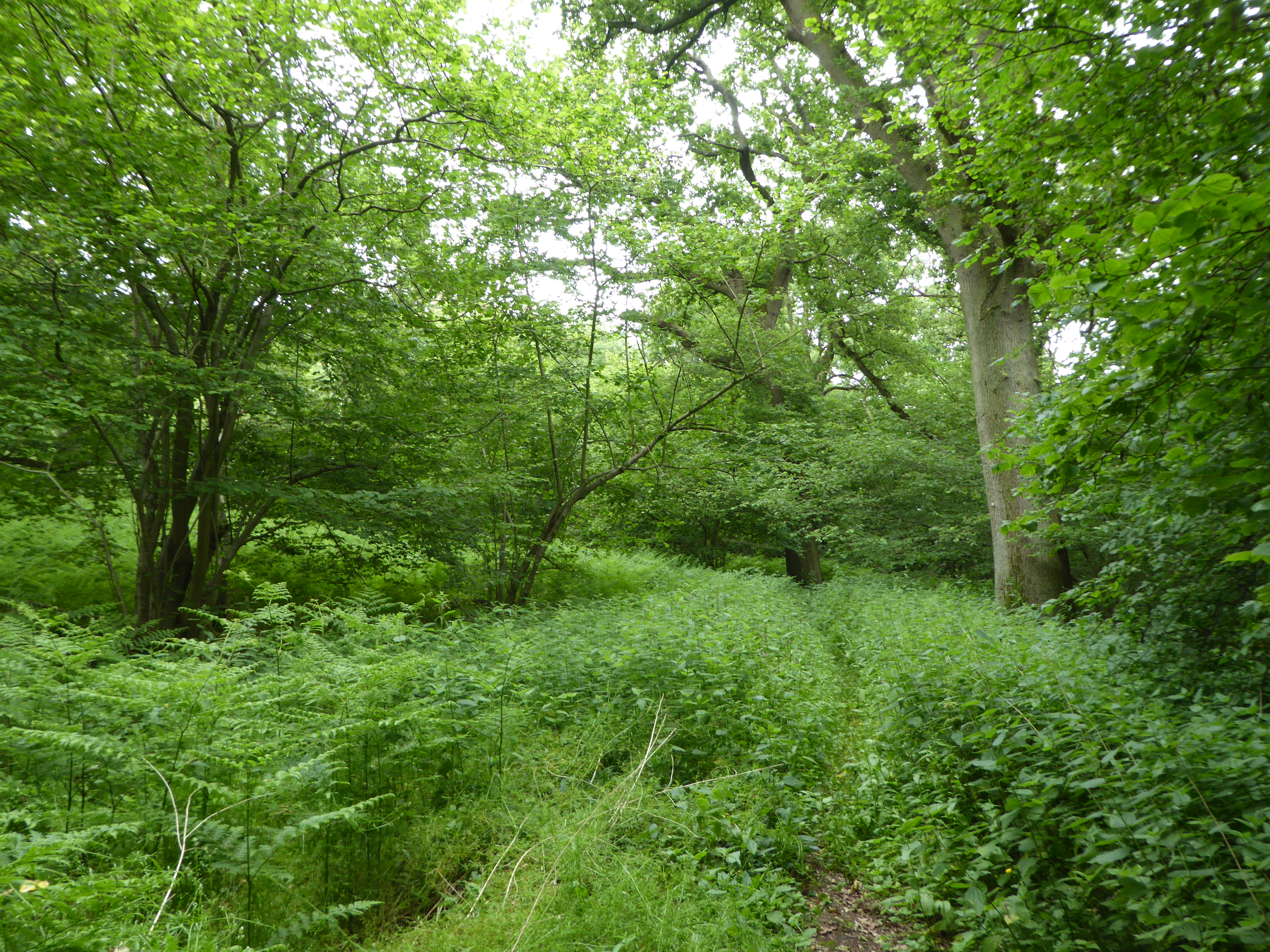
- Barney Wood
- Location of Swanton Novers Woods.
- Area of search: Norfolk
- Grid reference: TG 007 316
- Interest: Biological
- Area: 83.0 hectares (205 acres)
- Notification date: 1988
- Location map: Magic Map

Swanton Novers Woods is an 83-hectare (210-acre) biological Site of Special Scientific Interest east of Fakenham in Norfolk, England. The site is composed of Swanton Great Wood, Little Wood, Barney Wood and Guybon's Wood. It is a Nature Conservation Review site, Grade I. Swanton Great Wood and Little Wood are designated Swanton Novers National Nature Reserve.

The ancient woods are almost certainly of primary origin, and they are regarded as one of the most important groups of woods in the country. The trees and ground flora are exceptionally diverse, and they include the nationally rare May lily.

The site is currently closed to the public although the main public footpaths are still accessible.
