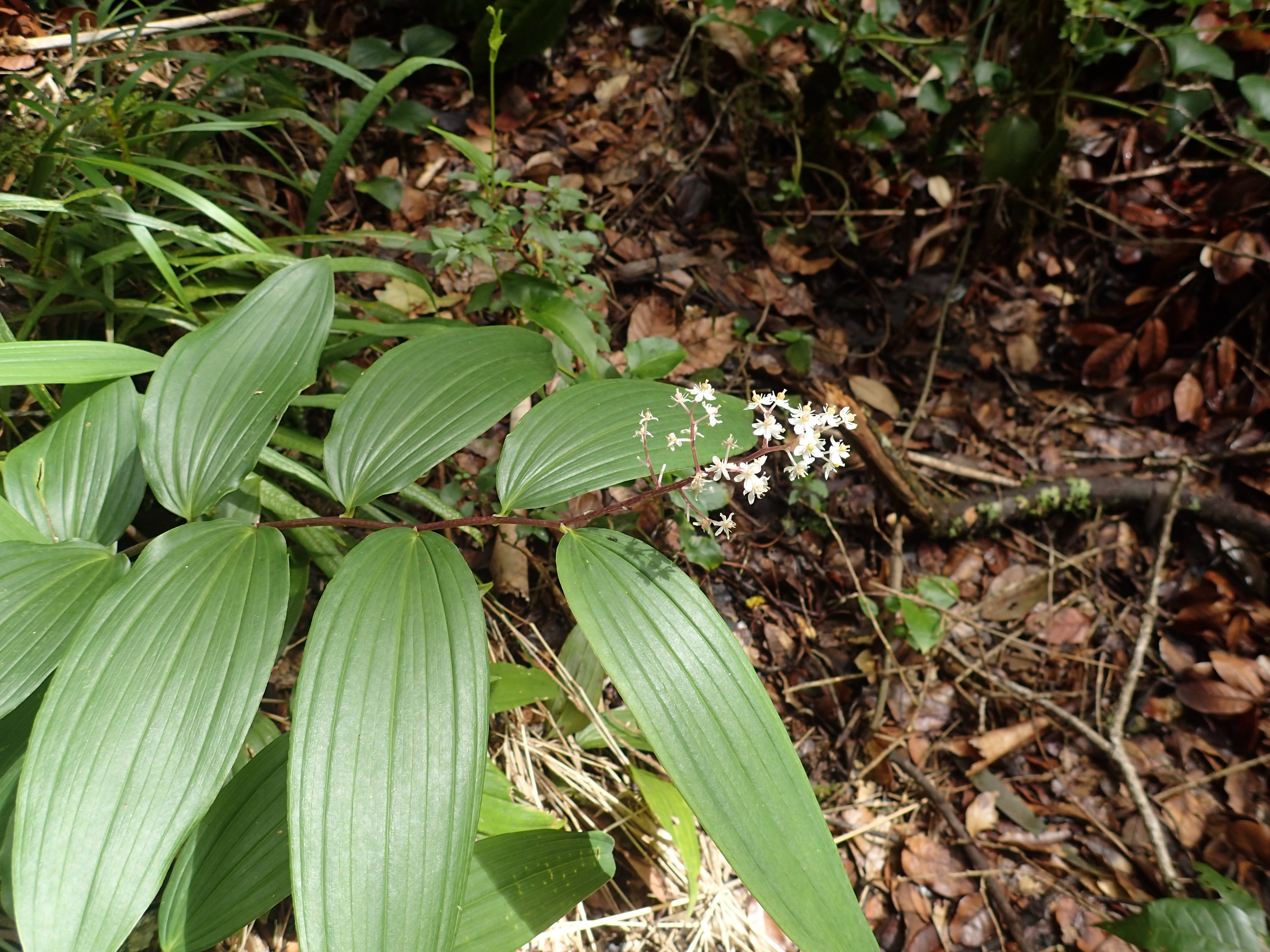

Scientific classification
- Kingdom: Plantae
- Clade: Tracheophytes
- Clade: Angiosperms
- Clade: Monocots
- Order: Asparagales
- Family: Asparagaceae
- Subfamily: Convallarioideae
- Genus: Maianthemum
- Species: M. paniculatum

Binomial name
- Maianthemum paniculatum (M. Martens & Galeotti) La Frankie

Synonyms,
- Homotypic Synonyms: Smilacina paniculata M.Martens & Galeotti; Tovaria paniculata (M.Martens & Galeotti) Baker; Vagnera paniculata (M.Martens & Galeotti) Standl.; Heterotypic Synonyms: Maianthemum septifolium LaFrankie; Smilacina laxiflora (Baker) Hemsl.; Smilacina nervulosa (Baker) Hemsl.; Smilacina thyrsoidea (Baker) Hemsl.; Tovaria laxiflora Baker; Tovaria nervulosa Baker; Tovaria thyrsoidea Baker

= Maianthemum paniculatum =

Species of flowering plant

Maianthemum paniculatum is a perennial flowering plant; a species of monocot found from Mexico to Panama. It is often associated with montane environments and is found primarily in forest openings and along roadsides.

== Taxonomy ==
This is a variable species with numerous synonyms. Smaller plants from Chiapas, Mexico, with narrow rhizomes and 10 or fewer stem leaves have been treated as Maianthemum septifolium. Current treatments however includes these in M. paniculatum.

== Description ==
The species typically grows 0.7–1.5 m (2–5 ft) tall off a base of forked rhizomes. Roots are spread evenly along the rhizome. Stems are hairless, upright, leaning or arching and leafy; usually with 10-15 leaves set 4–7 cm (2–3 in) apart, although some plants are smaller, with 6-10 leaves (previously treated as a separate species).

=== Leaves ===
Leaves have a 4–9 mm long petiole. Leaf blades are egg- shaped to elliptical with pointed tips and tapered bases. They are 9–14 cm (4–6 in) long by 3.5–6 cm (1–2 in) wide with undulating edges. Veins are prominent and the leaf surface is hairless.

=== Flowering clusters ===
70 to 200 flowers are set on a pyramid-shaped, branched flowering stalk (panicle). The main axis of the panicle is about 15 cm long and arches upward. Smaller plants have 25-60 flowers in a cylindrical panicle with a 6–8 cm long central axis. The axis is weakly ribbed and green or maroon. About 8 to 15 spreading to ascending side branches are set at 4–20 mm intervals along the main axis of the panicle. The side branches are 5–25 cm long with 1 or 2 flowers at the base and others set at intervals of 1–20 mm along the branch. Flowers are set on stalks (pedicels) that are 1–4 mm long and weakly ribbed.

=== Flowers and fruits ===
The flowers are made up of white, spreading tepals 2–42 mm long that are roughly equal in size. Stamens are inserted at the tepal base. Fruits are rounded to weakly 3-lobed, 8–12 mm across, green mottled with red when immature, ripening to red. Flowering and fruiting occurs throughout the year, with fruits and flowers sometimes found on the same plant.

== Distribution ==
Maianthemum paniculatum has been found in Costa Rica, El Salvador, Guatemala, Honduras, and Panamá as well as the Mexican states of Chiapas, Guerrero, Hidalgo, Oaxaca, Puebla and Veracruz.

== Habitat and ecology ==
This species is often found along roadsides and in forest openings, although it sometimes persists in shade. It may be found growing in dense clusters.
