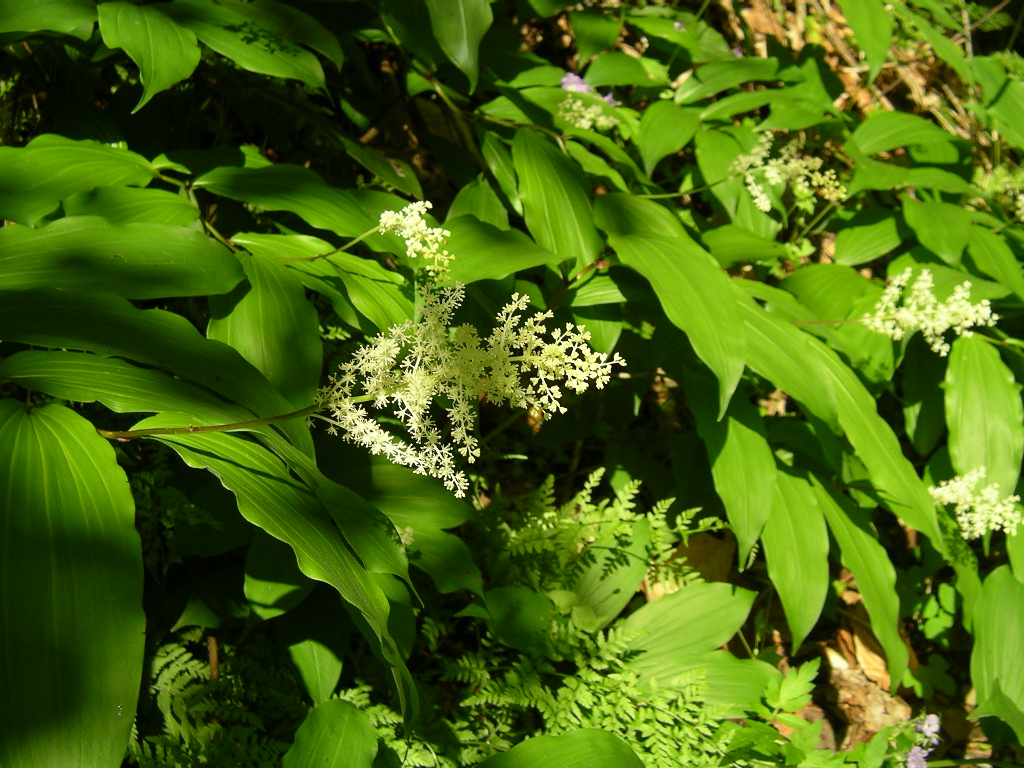
- Maianthemum racemosum

Scientific classification
- Kingdom: Plantae
- Clade: Embryophytes
- Clade: Tracheophytes
- Clade: Angiosperms
- Clade: Monocots
- Order: Asparagales
- Family: Asparagaceae
- Subfamily: Convallarioideae
- Genus: Maianthemum; F.H.Wigg.

Synonyms
- Smilacina Desf.; Unifolium Zinn; Vagnera Adans.; Valentinia Heist. ex Fabr.; Polygonastrum Moench; Bifolium G.Gaertn., B.Mey. & Schreb.; Sciophila Wibel.; Monophyllon Delarbre; Sigillaria Raf.; Styrandra Raf.; Asteranthemum Kunth; Jocaste Kunth; Medora Kunth; Maia Salisb.; Neolexis Salisb.; Tovaria Neck. ex Baker; Oligobotrya Baker

= Maianthemum =

Genus of flowering plants

Maianthemum includes the former genus Smilacina and is a genus of perennial herbaceous flowering plants with fleshy, persistent rhizomes. It is widespread across much of North America, Europe and Asia, and may be terrestrial, aquatic or epiphytic. It is characterized by simple, unbranched stems that are upright, leaning or hanging down and have 2–17 foliage leaves. Leaves are simple and may clasp the stem or be short-petiolate. The inflorescence is terminal and either a panicle or a raceme with few to many pedicelate flowers. Most species have 6 tepals and 6 stamens; a few have parts in 4s. Tepals are distinct in most species and all of similar size. Flowers are spreading, cup-shaped or bell-shaped and usually white, but lavender to red or green in some species. Fruits are rounded to lobed berries containing few to several seeds.

== Vegetative ==
Rhizomes and roots

Rhizomes are persistent and have scale leaves. They can be sympodial; spreading and thread-like, or cylindric, clumped and fleshy. Maianthemum paludicola has an unusual woody, upright sympodial rhizome set above ground. Roots may be spread along the rhizome, clumped at the nodes, or clumped near the base of leafy shoots. The rhizome is the perennial part of the plant and growth is by branching of the rhizome. Flowering/fruiting shoots are attached to the rhizome by a discreet internode, are short-lived and wither at the end of the growing season.

Stems and leaves

The stems are unbranched and pendant to arching or upright. Fertile plants have 2 to 17 or more stem (cauline) leaves (arising from the stem) that are alternate along the stem. Most species produce fertile shoots seasonally. A few species such as Maianthemum canadense and Maianthemum dilatatum also have a vegetative phase, producing a solitary leaf on sterile shoots; plants may continue in this vegetative phase for up to six years. Maianthemum trifolium produces two petiolate foliage leaves the first year, then a flowering shoot the second year with 2-4 sessile leaves. In most species, leaves have a large midvein, dividing the leaves in half, then each half is again divided by a slightly smaller vein; each quarter again divided by progressively finer veins. The resulting pattern is that the leaves have three prominent veins, and adjacent veins are of different diameters. A few species, such as Maianthemum stellatum, have leaves with veins that are often all of roughly the same diameter. Leaf edges may be flat or wavy (undulate) and sometimes have small, outward-pointing teeth.

== Reproductive ==
Inflorescence

The inflorescence is either a panicle or a raceme with few to many pedicellate flowers. Racemes may be simple (one flower per node) or complex (some nodes with 2 or more flowers). Panicles may be few- to many-branched and the branches themselves are often racemose. A few Asian species such as Maianthemum henryi have a main axis with fully extended racemose branches at lower nodes and upper nodes with clustered flowers. The type and pattern of inflorescence is the most useful feature to separate Maianthemum species.

Flowers

The flowers are actinomorphic (radially symmetric) and relatively small. The perianth in most species has six tepals, in two whorls of three (trimerous). Maianthemum canadense, Maianthemum dilatatum, and Maianthemum bifolium however are dimerous, with 4-tepaled flowers. Tepals are greenish, or white to pink or mauve in most species, but are a deep purple in Maianthemum purpureum and may have purple spots in Maianthemum gigas var. gigas. The tepals in most species are free (not fused), all of a similar size and flowers are spreading to cup-shaped. Some Asian species such as Maianthemum henryi have bell-shaped (campanulate) flowers with partially fused tepals. The flowers are usually bisexual, containing both male (androecium) and female (gynoecium) parts, although two species from Japan, Maianthemum hondoense and Maianthemum yesoense, are reported to be unisexual.

Gynoecium

The ovaries are superior (attached above the other floral parts) and are spherical to cylindrical. The pistil has two or three carpels separated by walls with nectar-carrying canals. Styles are narrow (< 5mm wide) and about as long as the ovary. Stigmas are lobed and slightly wider than the style.

Androecium

Stamens are 4 or 6 and usually inserted at the base of the tepals, but may be inserted about 1 mm above, as in Maianthemum flexuosum. Anthers are cylindrical and split longitudinally.

Fruit and seeds

The berry is globose and often lobed. Berries ripen to red. In most species unripe berries are green or green mottled with red or copper. In some, e.g. Maianthemum stellatum the immature berries have dark stipes. The seeds are usually few and spherical but in some species may be conical.

== Morphology ==
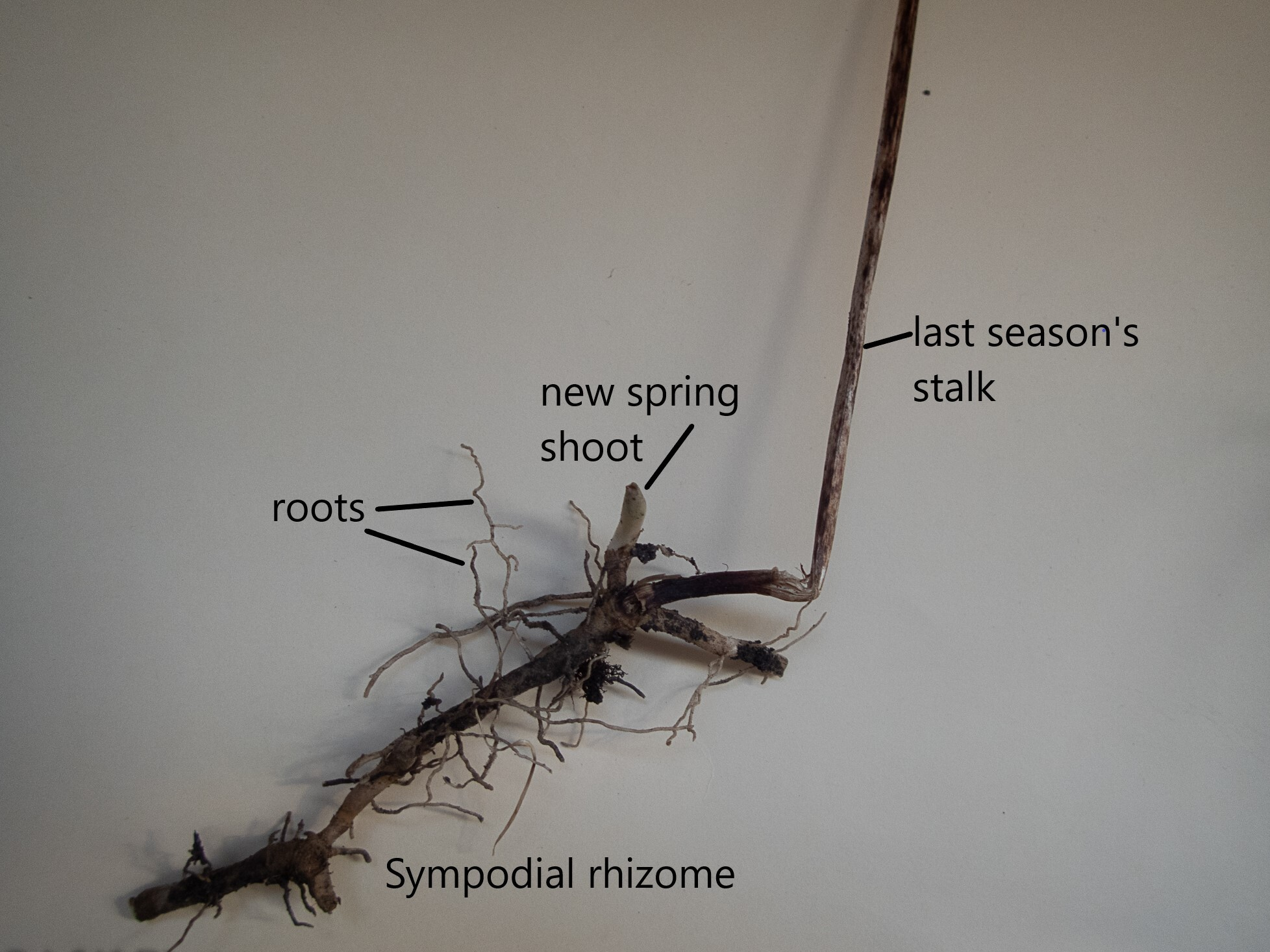
Rhizome and roots: M. stellatum

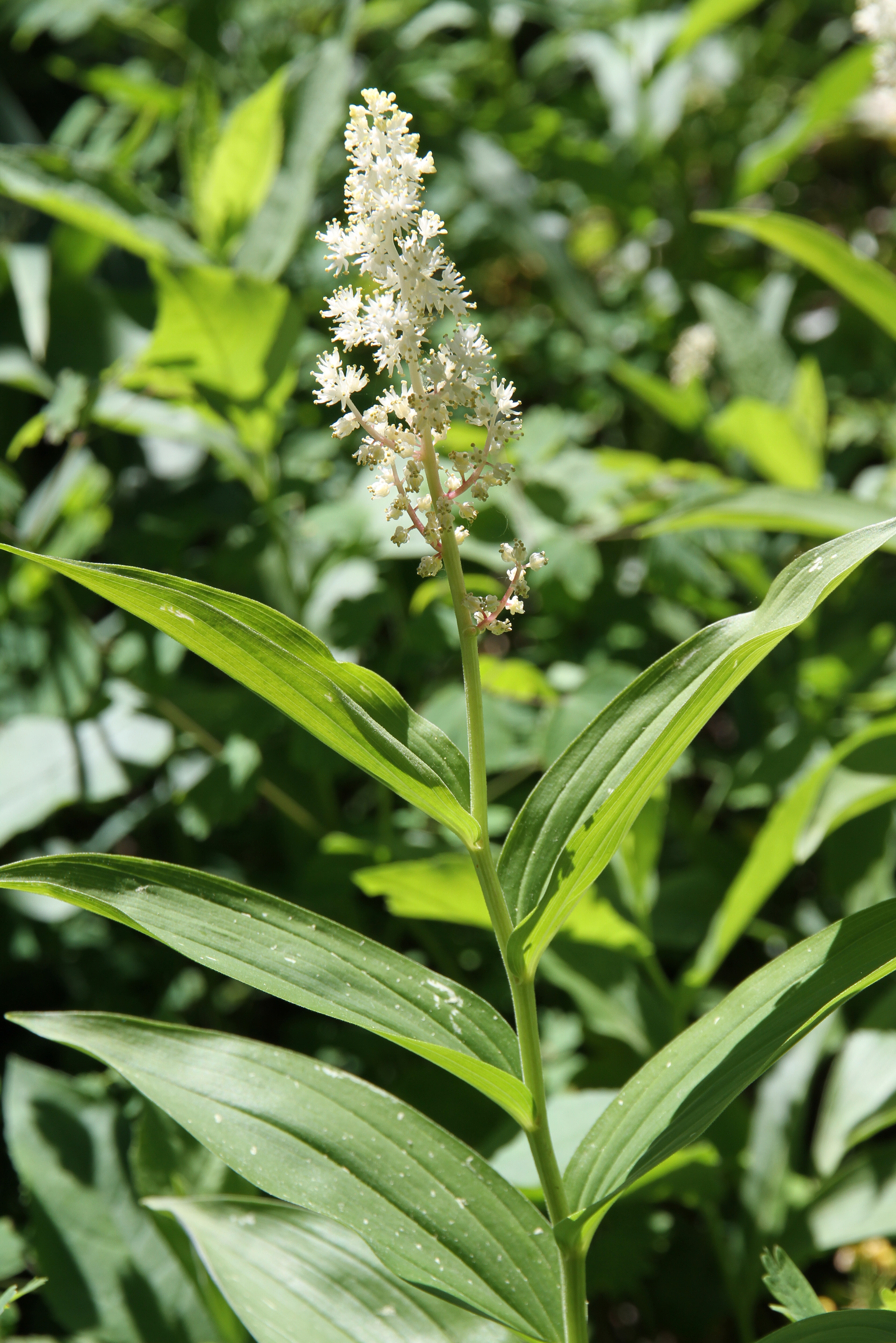
Unbranched, upright stem: M. racemosum amplexicaule

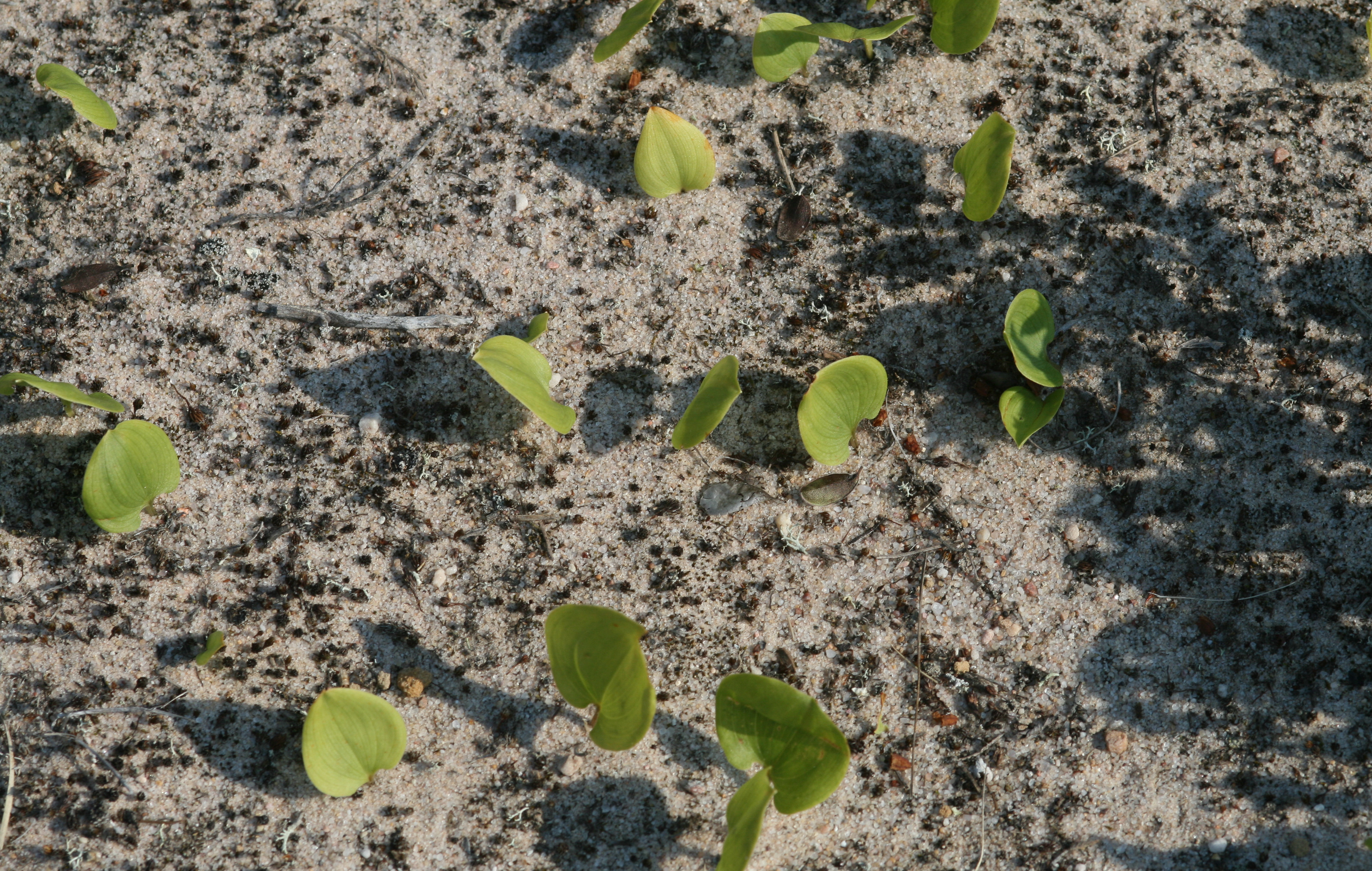
Sterile plants: M. canadense

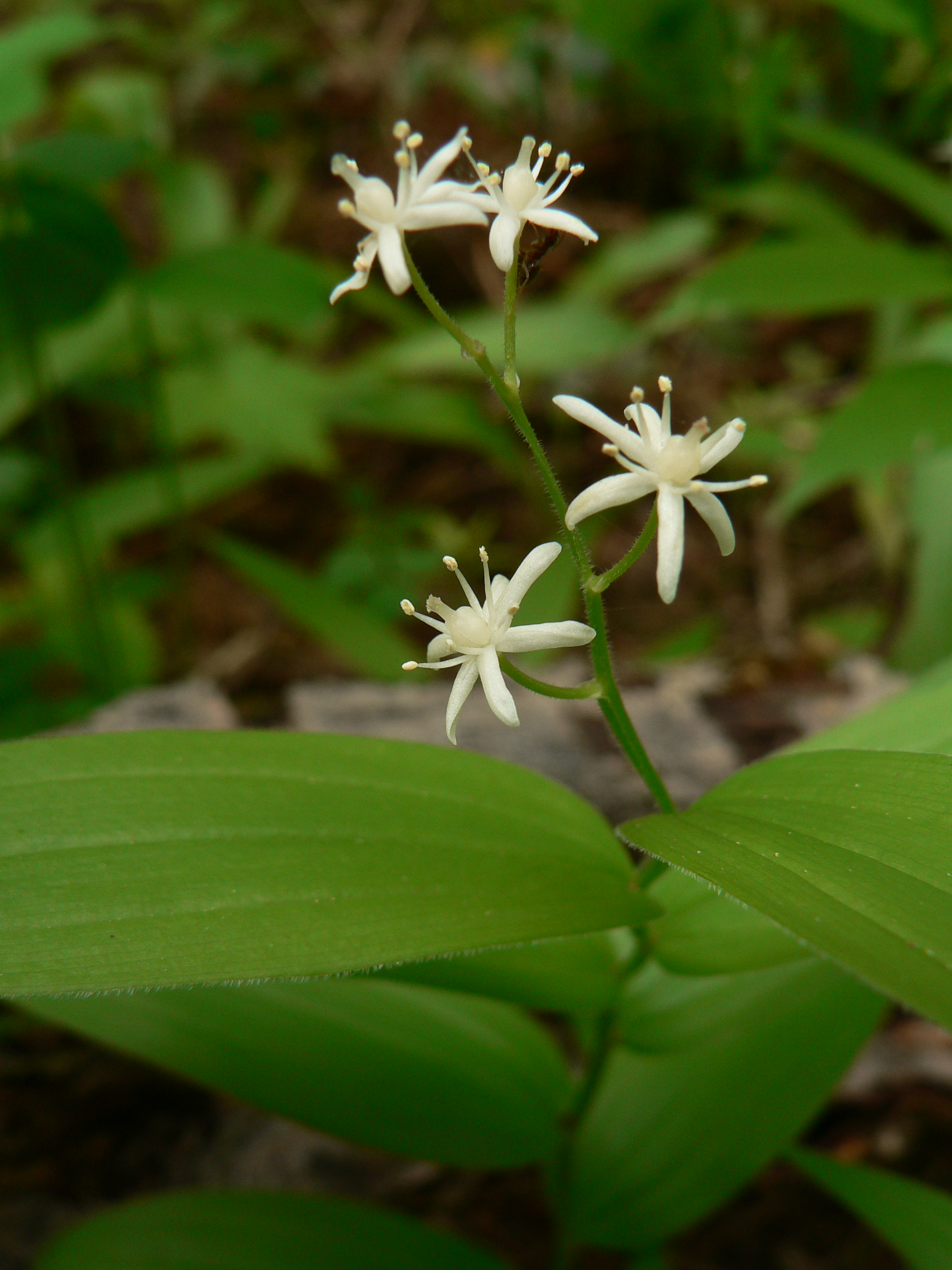
Simple raceme; one pedicellate flower per node: M. stellatum

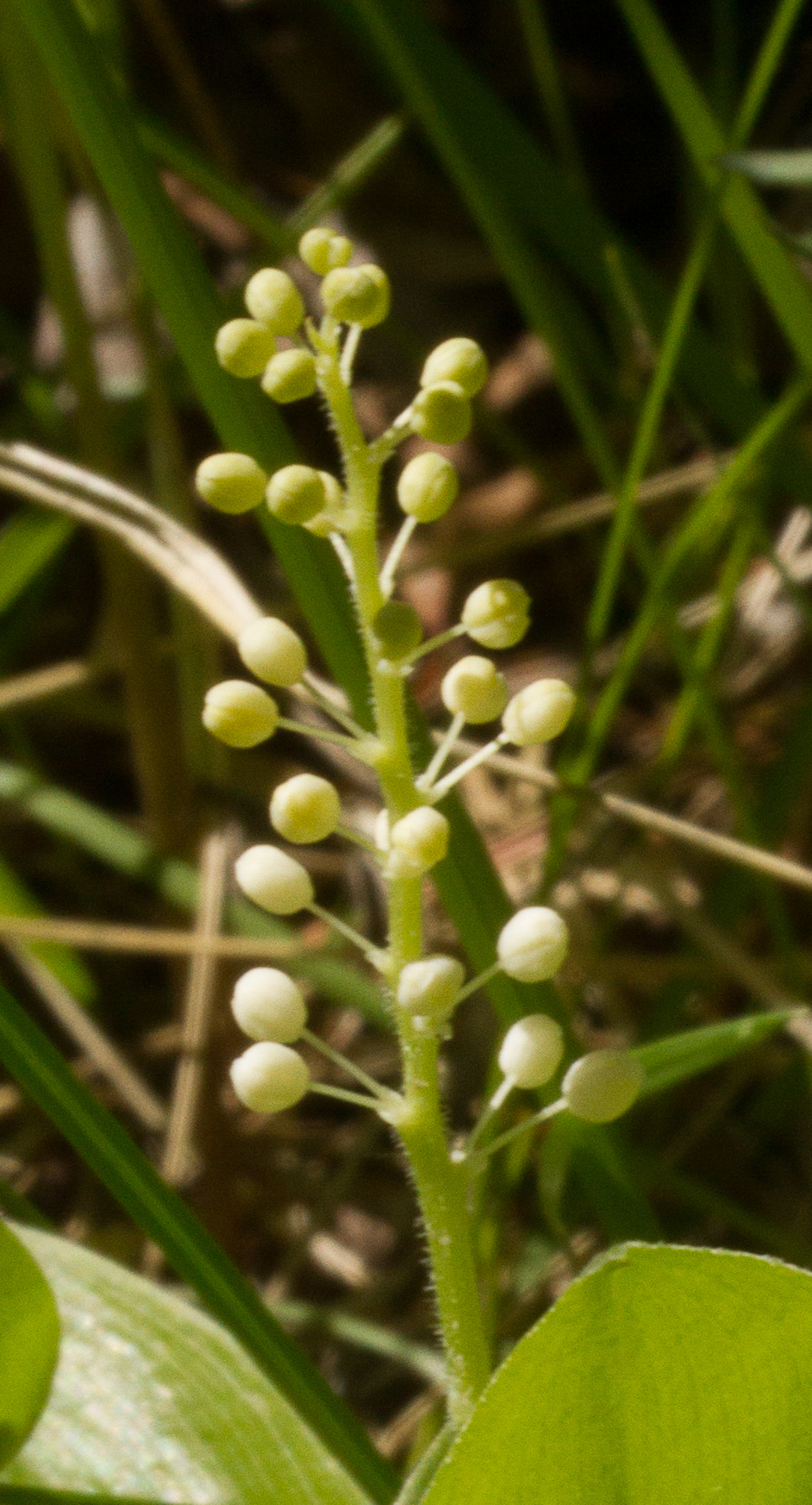
Complex raceme, some nodes with 2 flowers: M. canadense

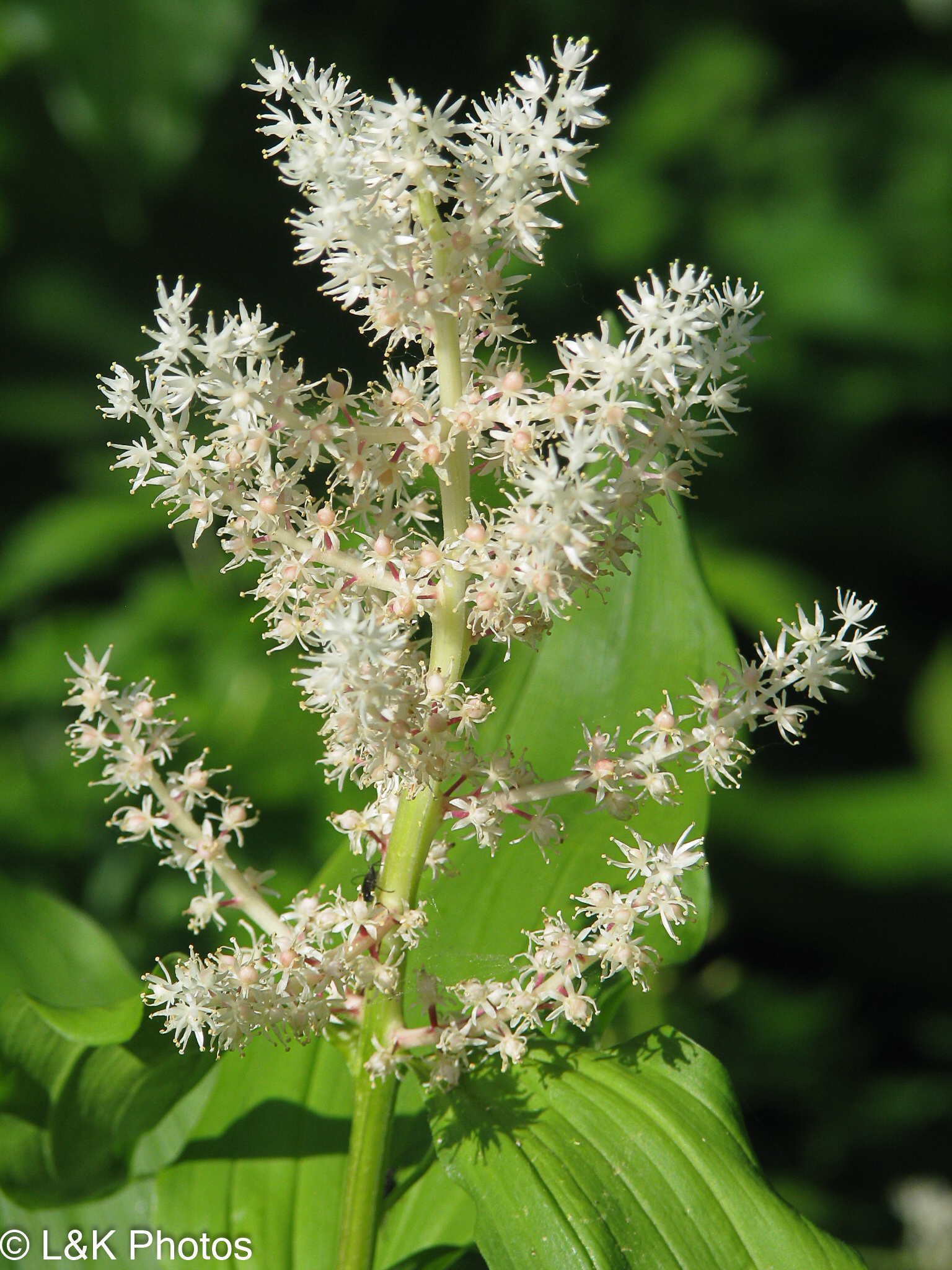
Panicle with main axis and side branches: M. racemosum amplexicaule

== Taxonomy ==
The current concept includes species that were previously divided into 2 closely related genera; Maianthemum, including dimerous species and Smilacina for the trimerous ones. Studies in the 1970s showed strong genetic similarity, similar fruits, and evidence that the 4-tepal species evolved from a 6-tepal species, so the genus Smilacina was combined with Maianthemum.

=== Phylogeny ===
In the APG III classification system, Maianthemum is placed in the family Asparagaceae, subfamily Convallarioideae (formerly the family Ruscaceae). Like many lilioid monocots, Maianthemum (including the former Smilacina) were formerly included in the family Liliaceae. The genus has also been placed in the former family Convallariaceae, and resembles the closely related Polygonatum, hence the common name "false Solomon's seal".

== Etymology ==
Maianthemum comes from the Greek for "May" (maios) and “flower” (Anthos).

== Distribution and habitat ==
The genus is widespread across much of North America, Europe and Asia,

== Ecology ==
The majority of species are spring-flowering forest herbs, requiring shaded, moist conditions and cool temperatures. Some however (e.g. Maianthemum monteverdense) are epiphytes. Others such as Maianthemum stellatum grow in diverse habitats from sand dunes to forest under-stories. And Maianthemum trifolium and Maianthemum paludicola are found in full sun in open wetlands. M. trifolium is sometimes considered aquatic. The species that are forest herbs generally begin growth in early spring, with leaves expanding before the tree canopy fully develops. Epiphytic tropical species usually grow new shoots in the dry season.

== Conservation ==
Many of the North American Maianthemum are widespread and relatively common. Several though are considered endemic to the wider “Mesomexico”. Maianthemum comaltepecense is a rare perennial, terrestrial herb found as an understory species in moist forests, known only from Oaxaca, Mexico, and endemic to southwest Mexico.

== Species ==
Species accepted:

- Maianthemum amoenum (H.L.Wendl.) LaFrankie – Honduras, El Salvador, Guatemala, Mexico (Chiapas, Oaxaca, Veracruz)
- Maianthemum atropurpureum (Franch.) LaFrankie – Sichuan, Yunnan
- Maianthemum bicolor (Nakai) Cubey – Korea
- Maianthemum bifolium (L.) F.W.Schmidt – northern and central Europe and northern Asia from Spain to Kamchatka; China, Japan, Siberia, Kazakhstan, Germany, Italy, Ukraine, etc
- Maianthemum canadense Desf. – St. Pierre and Miquelon, much of eastern USA and all provinces and territories in Canada except Nunavut
- Maianthemum comaltepecense Espejo, López-Ferr. & Ceja – Mexico (Oaxaca)
- Maianthemum dahuricum (Turcz. ex Fisch. & C.A.Mey.) LaFrankie – Siberia, Russian Far East, Manchuria, Inner Mongolia, Korea
- Maianthemum dilatatum (Alph.Wood) A.Nelson & J.F.Macbr. – Mongolia, Korea, Japan, Russian Far East, Alaska, Yukon, British Columbia, Washington, Idaho, Oregon, California
- Maianthemum flexuosum (Bertol.) LaFrankie – Mexico (Chiapas, Guerrero, Hidalgo, Michoacán, Oaxaca, Veracruz), El Salvador, Guatemala, Honduras, Nicaragua
- Maianthemum formosanum (Hayata) LaFrankie – Taiwan
- Maianthemum forrestii (W.W.Sm.) LaFrankie – Yunnan
- Maianthemum fusciduliflorum (Kawano) S.C.Chen & Kawano – Tibet, Yunnan, Bhutan, Assam, Myanmar
- Maianthemum fuscum (Wall.) LaFrankie – Nepal, Tibet, Yunnan, Bhutan, Assam, Myanmar
- Maianthemum gigas (Woodson) LaFrankie – Mexico (Chiapas), Costa Rica, Guatemala, Panama, and Nicaragua
- Maianthemum gongshanense (S.Yun Liang) H.Li – Yunnan
- Maianthemum henryi (Baker) LaFrankie – Vietnam, Myanmar, Tibet, southern China
- Maianthemum hondoense (Ohwi) LaFrankie – Honshu
- Maianthemum × intermedium Vorosch. – Siberia, Russian Far East (M. bifolium × M. dilatatum)
- Maianthemum japonicum (A.Gray) LaFrankie – Russian Far East, Japan, Korea, northeastern China
- Maianthemum lichiangense (W.W.Sm.) LaFrankie – Gansu, Shaanxi, Sichuan, Yunnan
- Maianthemum macrophyllum (M.Martens & Galeotti) LaFrankie – Mexico (Veracruz, Oaxaca)
- Maianthemum mexicanum García Arév – Mexico (Durango, Sinaloa)
- Maianthemum monteverdense LaFrankie – Nicaragua, Costa Rica
- Maianthemum nanchuanense H.Li & J.L.Huang – Sichuan
- Maianthemum oleraceum (Baker) LaFrankie – Nepal, Bhutan, Assam, Myanmar, Tibet, Sikkim, Guizhou, Sichuan, Yunnan
- Maianthemum paludicola LaFrankie – Costa Rica
- Maianthemum paniculatum (M.Martens & Galeotti) LaFrankie – Mexico (Chiapas, Guerrero, Hidalgo, Oaxaca, Puebla and Veracruz), Costa Rica, El Salvador, Guatemala, Honduras, and Panamá
- Maianthemum purpureum (Wall.) LaFrankie – Tibet, Yunnan, Nepal, Bhutan, Sikkim, Assam (also called Himalayan Mayflower or Purple Mayflower)
- Maianthemum racemosum (L.) Link – All USA states, all Canadian provinces and territories (except Nunavut and Labrador) and Mexico (Chihuahua)
- Maianthemum robustum (Makino & Honda) LaFrankie – Honshu
- Maianthemum salvinii (Baker) LaFrankie – Mexico (Chiapas), Guatemala
- Maianthemum scilloideum (M.Martens & Galeotti) LaFrankie – Mexico (Chiapas, Coahuila, Guerrero, Michoacán, Nuevo León, Oaxaca, Puebla and Veracruz), Guatemala, Honduras
- Maianthemum stellatum (L.) Link – Most states in USA (except those southeast of New Mexico), all Canadian provinces and territories (except Nunavut and Labrador) and in the Mexican states of Chihuahua, Coahuila, Nuevo León and Sonoroa; introduced in Norway, Sweden
- Maianthemum stenolobum (Franch.) S.C.Chen & Kawano – Sichuan, Gansu, Hubei
- Maianthemum szechuanicum (F.T.Wang & Tang) H.Li – Sichuan, Yunnan
- Maianthemum tatsienense (Franch.) LaFrankie – Bhutan, Assam, Myanmar, Gansu, Guangxi, Guizhou, Hubei, Hunan, Sichuan, Yunnan
- Maianthemum trifolium (L.) Sloboda – Siberia, Russian Far East to North Korea, St. Pierre and Miquelon, all Canadian provinces and territories, northeastern United States
- Maianthemum tubiferum (Batalin) LaFrankie – Gansu, Hubei, Qinghai, Shaanxi, Sichuan
- Maianthemum yesoense (Franch. & Sav.) LaFrankie – Japan

== See also ==
- Polygonatum
