= Maianthemum flexuosum =

Scientific classification
- Kingdom: Plantae
- Clade: Embryophytes
- Clade: Tracheophytes
- Clade: Angiosperms
- Clade: Monocots
- Order: Asparagales
- Family: Asparagaceae
- Subfamily: Convallarioideae
- Genus: Maianthemum
- Species: M. flexuosum

Binomial name
- Maianthemum flexuosum (Bertol.) LaFrankie

Synonyms
- Smilacina bertolonii Kunth.; Smilacina flexuosa Hook.; Smilacina flexuosa Bertol. .; Smilacina flexuosa var. erubescens Emons; Tovaria flexuosa (Bertol.) Baker; Vagnera flexuosa (Bertol.) Standl

Species of flowering plant

Maianthemum flexuosum is a perennial, terrestrial understory herb of cloud forests from southern Mexico to Nicaragua. It has been found at sites from 1,300 to 2,800 m (4,300 to 9,200 ft) elevation.

== Description ==
Maianthemum flexuosum grows 40–75 cm (16–30 in) tall from spreading rhizomes with roots clumped near the base of leafy shoots. Leafy, arching stems are hairless and slightly ribbed.

=== Leaves ===
There are 7–9 (sometimes up to 12 leaves) set 3.5–6 cm (1–2 in) apart; more closely spaced near the tip of the plant. Leaves have short petioles, less than 5 mm long and are 8–12 cm (3–5 in) long by 3–5 cm (1–2 in) wide with evident veins. Leaf blades sometimes have small hairs but are usually hairless, lance- to egg-shaped with pointed tips and rounded to slightly tapered bases and with undulating edges.

=== Flowering clusters ===
25 to 65 flowers are set in a complex raceme with a main axis 5–18 cm (2.0–7.1 in) long that is drooping and flexuous. The axis is smooth to slightly ribbed, green, and smooth. There are 10 to 16 nodes along the main axis, 1–8 (up to 20) mm apart and arranged in 2 rows along the main axis. Each node has 2 to 4 (sometimes up to 6) flowers set on drooping pedicels that are usually 8–21 mm long.

=== Flowers and fruits ===
The flowers have tepals that are spreading to bent back, 5–11 mm long and usually lavender to pink (rarely white to green-white). Stamens are inserted slightly (about 1 mm) above the tepal bases. Fruits are distinctly 3-lobed, 7–11 mm across, green when immature, ripening to red. Flowering is from January to June; fruits set May to August. Plants sometimes have both flowers and fruits.

== Distribution ==
Maianthemum flexuosum has been found in El Salvador, Guatemala, Honduras and Nicaragua and several states in Mexico Southeast including Chiapas, Guerrero, Hidalgo, Michoacán, Oaxaca, and Veracruz.

== Habitat and ecology ==
This is an understory herb of wet, broad-leaved cloud forests. It is often solitary or sometimes loosely colonial and typically found at sites from 1,450 to 2,200 m (4,760 to 7,220 ft) elevation although it has been found at sites as low as 1,000 m (3,300 ft) to others at over 2,500 m (8,200 ft).
