= Maianthemum salvinii =

Scientific classification
- Kingdom: Plantae
- Clade: Embryophytes
- Clade: Tracheophytes
- Clade: Angiosperms
- Clade: Monocots
- Order: Asparagales
- Family: Asparagaceae
- Subfamily: Convallarioideae
- Genus: Maianthemum
- Species: M. salvinii

Binomial name
- Maianthemum salvinii (Baker) LaFrankie

Synonyms
- Smilacina amoena var. salvinii (Baker) Emons; Smilacina salvinii (Baker) Hemsl.; Tovaria salvinii Baker; Vagnera salvinii (Baker) Standl.

Species of flowering plant

Maianthemum salvinii is a rare perennial, epiphytic herb found in southern Mexico and Guatemala.

== Description ==
Plants grow from 0.75–1 m (2–3 ft) tall from rhizomes. Leafy, straight to arching stems are hairless and ribbed.

=== Leaves ===
There are usually more than 7 leaves along the stalk, set 2–4 cm (1–2 in) apart; more closely spaced near the tip of the plant. They have short, 2–5 mm long petioles and are 15–23 cm (6–9 in) long by 5–7.5 cm (2–3 in) wide with evident veins. Leaf blades are hairless, lance- to egg-shaped with pointed tips and rounded to long-tapered bases and with flat (not undulating) edges.

=== Inflorescence ===
120 to 150 flowers are set in a complex raceme with a main axis 14–35 cm (5.5–13.8 in) long that is hanging but straight. The axis is ribbed, and smooth. There are 25 to 40 nodes along the main axis, set about 5 cm apart and set in helix along the main axis. Each node has 3 or 4 flowers set on slightly bent-back, drooping pedicels that are usually 15–25 (up to 30) mm long.

=== Flowers and fruits ===
The flowers are cup-shaped, with spreading tepals that are 4–4.5 mm long and lavender to pale pink. Stamens are inserted at the tepal bases. Fruits are rounded, 8–10 mm across, ripening to red. Flowering is in March; fruits are retained into January or February.

== Distribution ==
The distribution of Maianthemum salvinii is not well documented, but is reported from Guatemala and southeast Mexico. It is thought to be rare. The site in Guatemala that it was found has been developed, so is unlikely to have persisted there. It has also been documented adjacent to Guatemala, in the mountainous Tacaná-Boquerón region of Chiapas, Mexico.

== Habitat and ecology ==
Maianthemum salvinii Is an epiphyte of primary forests. In Guatemala it was found in forests on white sand slopes at 1,800–2,000 m (5,900–6,600 ft). It has also been found in the mountainous Tacaná-Boquerón region that has extensive montane cloud forests.

== Bibliography ==
LaFrankie (October 1986). "Morphology and taxonomy of the new world species of Maianthemum (Liliaceae)". Journal of the Arnold Arboretum. 67 (4): 371-439. doi:10.5962/bhl.part.27393.
