= Maianthemum mexicanum =

Scientific classification
- Kingdom: Plantae
- Clade: Embryophytes
- Clade: Tracheophytes
- Clade: Angiosperms
- Clade: Monocots
- Order: Asparagales
- Family: Asparagaceae
- Subfamily: Convallarioideae
- Genus: Maianthemum
- Species: M. mexicanum

Binomial name
- Maianthemum mexicanum García Arév.

Species of flowering plant

Maianthemum mexicanum is a perennial, terrestrial herb found as an understory species in moist forests. It is endemic to west-central Mexico.

== Description ==
Plants grow 31–60 cm (12–24 in) tall from branching rhizomes. Roots are set along the rhizome. Stems are erect and grow in a zig-zag pattern. They are usually hairless but there may be small hairs on the ribs.

=== Leaves ===
There are usually 6-10 leaves 6.5–13 cm (3–5 in) long by 2–5.3 cm (1–2 in) wide, sessile or with short petioles. Leaf blades are hairless, lance- to egg-shaped with pointed tips and rounded to tapered bases. The upper surface is green, the lower glaucous.

=== Flowering clusters ===
Up to 110 flowers are set on an elongated panicle, that becomes diffusely branched in at maturity. The main axis is 6 cm (2.4 in) long. Short side branches (<1 cm long) have 4-10 flowers each.

=== Flowers and fruits ===
The flowers are yellowish-white, set on 0.7 to 1.5 mm long pedicels that have small, conical hairs. Tepals are ascending, inconspicuous and about 1 mm long. Stamens are inserted at the tepal bases. Fruits are rounded, 5–7 mm across, ripening to reddish brown.

== Distribution ==
Maianthemum mexicanum is reported from the west-central Mexican states of Sinaloa and Durango.

== Habitat and ecology ==
In Durango it has been found in wet hillside Pseudotsuga - Abies forests from 2,800 to 2,850 m (9,190 to 9,350 ft) elevation.

== Similar species ==
Maianthemum racemosum is similar, but it has a panicle that is pyramidal in shape, with well-developed secondary axes mostly longer than 1 cm long. The panicle of M. mexicanum has an elongated main axis with short side branches, usually <1 cm long.

== Bibliography ==
- García-Arévalo. 1992. Maianthemum mexicanum una Nueva Especie de Durang. Acta Botánica Mexicana (1992), 17:19-2
