= Maianthemum paludicola =

Scientific classification
- Kingdom: Plantae
- Clade: Tracheophytes
- Clade: Angiosperms
- Clade: Monocots
- Order: Asparagales
- Family: Asparagaceae
- Subfamily: Nolinoideae
- Genus: Maianthemum
- Species: M. paludicola

Binomial name
- Maianthemum paludicola LaFrankie

Species of flowering plant

Maianthemum paludicola is a perennial flowering plant. It is a rare terrestrial herb, endemic to Costa Rica. It has only been found in high-elevation bogs and wetlands and was first described in 1986.

== Description ==
Flower- and leaf-bearing stems grow off an unusual woody, aerial rhizome that is stiff, upright and linear or forked. It sits mostly out of the ground and is made up of lower parts of older shoots. Plants grow to 1 m (3 ft) tall or more, off the rhizome. Stems are upright, slightly flexuous, hairless and leafy. Stems usually have 9-12 (sometimes up to 14) spreading leaves set 1.5–3 cm (1–1 in) apart.

=== Leaves ===
Leaves have a short, 1-2 mm long petiole. Leaf blades are hairless, egg- to lance-shaped with pointed tips and rounded bases with flat (not undulating) edges. Upper leaves are 10–15 cm (4–6 in) long by 2–4.5 cm (1–2 in) wide. Lower leaves tend to be shorter and wider; 5–9 cm (2–4 in) long by 3–5 cm (1–2 in) wide. The venation pattern is distinctive, with veins that are uniform and not strongly evident.

=== Flowering clusters ===
40 to 80 (up to 120) flowers are set on a pyramid-shaped, branched flowering stalk (panicle). The main axis of the panicle is 6-20 cm long, stiff and upright. It is slightly ribbed, hairless and red-violet. About 5 to 15 spreading to ascending side branches are set at 3-10 mm intervals along the main axis of the panicle. The side branches are 3-8 cm long with 1 or 2 flowers at the base and others set at intervals of 1.6-6 mm along the branch. Flowers are set on pedicels that are 2-5 mm long, ribbed and hairless.

=== Flowers and fruits ===
The flowers have white, spreading tepals 3--4 mm long. Stamens are inserted at the tepal base. Fruits are rounded, 5-7 mm across, ripening to red. Flowering is from April to November but fruits are retained throughout the year.

== Distribution ==
This is a species endemic to Costa Rica, documented in the provinces of San José and Cartago.

== Habitat and ecology ==
Found from 2350 m to 3077 m elevation in open, boggy sites, including along powerlines.
