= Maianthemum macrophyllum =

Scientific classification
- Kingdom: Plantae
- Clade: Tracheophytes
- Clade: Angiosperms
- Clade: Monocots
- Order: Asparagales
- Family: Asparagaceae
- Subfamily: Convallarioideae
- Genus: Maianthemum
- Species: M. macrophyllum

Binomial name
- Maianthemum macrophyllum (M.Martens & Galeotti) LaFrankie

Synonyms
- Smilacina macrophylla M.Martens & Galeotti.

Species of flowering plant

Maianthemum macrophyllum is a perennial flowering plant. It is a rare epiphtic herb endemic to Veracruz and Oaxaca, Mexico and is known only from primary cloud forests, usually growing on limbs of oaks or sweetgum (Liquidambar styraciflua).

== Description ==
Plants grow from 0.75–1.25 m (2–4 ft) tall off a forked rhizome with evenly scattered roots. Stems are slightly arching, hairless and leafy. There are 13-18 leaves set 2.5–4 cm (1–2 in) apart; more closely spaced near the tip of the plant.

=== Leaves ===
Leaves have a 5–9 mm long petiole. Leaf blades are hairless, shiny, egg- to lance-shaped with pointed tips and rounded bases and with flat (not undulating) edges. The veins are evident. Upper leaves are 14–21 cm (6–8 in) long by 4.5–8 cm (2–3 in) wide. Lower leaves tend to be shorter but of similar width; 10–16 cm (4–6 in) long by 5–8 cm (2–3 in) wide.

=== Flowering clusters ===
60 to 120 flowers are set in a dense, complex raceme. It is composed of a main axis that arches upwards and is straight, stiff, 10–20 cm long, green, smooth and of uniform width. 25 to 50 nodes 5–10 mm apart are arranged in a helix around the main axis. Each node has 2 to 4 flowers set on drooping pedicels that are usually 4–6 mm long.

=== Flowers and fruits ===
The flowers are yellow-green to green-white and cup-shaped with tepals 4.5-5.5 mm long. Stamens are inserted at the base of the tepals. Blooming takes 3–4 weeks, with lower flowers opening first, and proceeding up the axis. Fruits are rounded, 8–9 mm across, green when immature, ripening to red. Flowering is from April to June, fruiting through to October.

== Distribution ==
Maianthemum macrophyllum has only been documented in Veracruz and Oaxaca, Mexico.

== Habitat and ecology ==
It is known only from primary cloud forests, usually growing on limbs of oaks or sweetgum (Liquidambar styraciflua) at 1300 to 2600 m.
