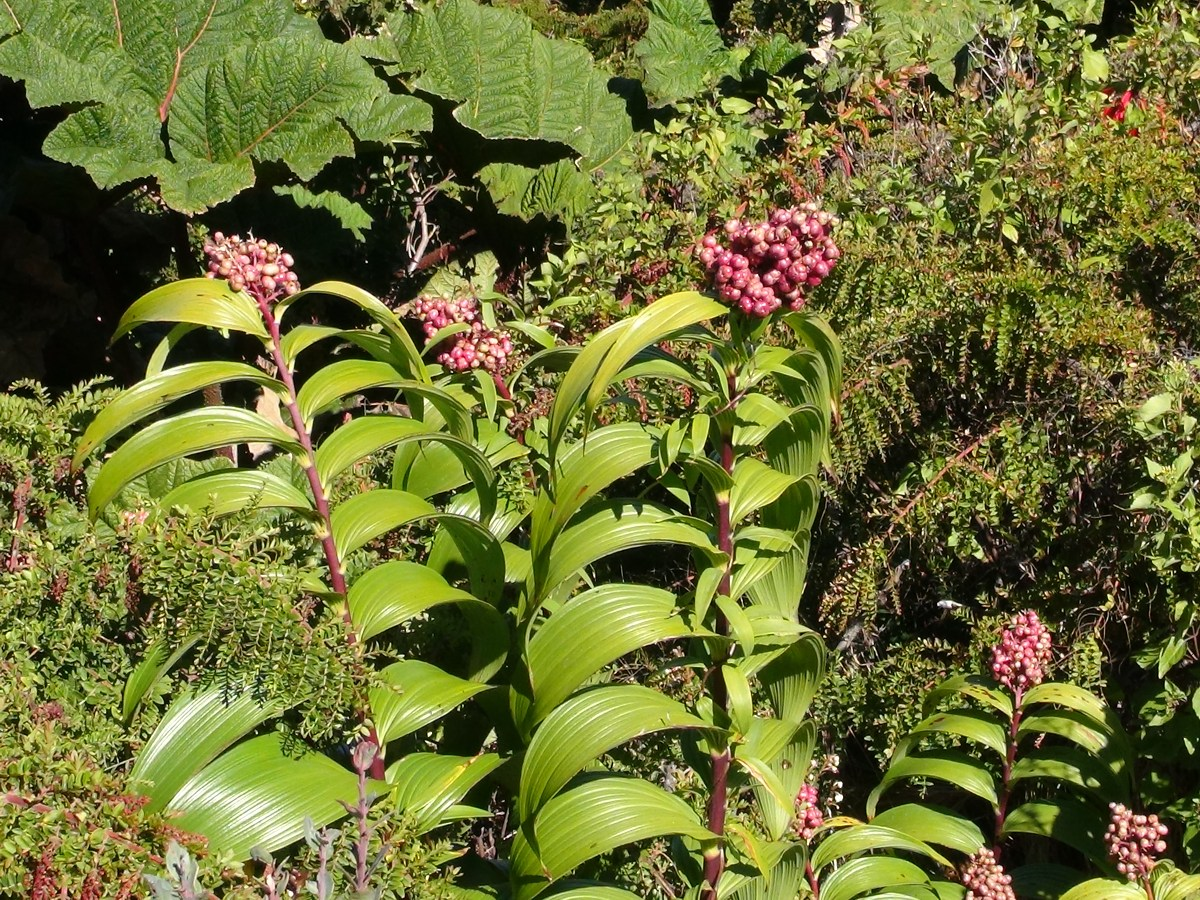

Scientific classification
- Kingdom: Plantae
- Clade: Tracheophytes
- Clade: Angiosperms
- Clade: Monocots
- Order: Asparagales
- Family: Asparagaceae
- Subfamily: Nolinoideae
- Genus: Maianthemum
- Species: M. gigas

Binomial name
- Maianthemum gigas (Woodson) LaFrankie

Synonyms
- Smilacina gigas Woodson

= Maianthemum gigas =

Species of flowering plant

Maianthemum gigas is a perennial flowering plant. It is found in Mexico and Central America, growing in forest openings and along roadsides or sometimes as an epiphyte on trees.

== Description ==
It grows 0.8–2.5 m (3–8 ft) tall off a base of forked rhizomes. Roots are scattered evenly along rhizome units. Stems are leaning or arching and leafy; usually with 10-16 leaves set 3–5.5 cm (1–2 in) apart.

=== Leaves ===
Leaves have a 4-5 mm long petiole. Leaf blades are egg-shaped to elliptical with pointed tips and rounded to tapered bases 14–30 cm (6–12 in) long by 5–9 cm (2–4 in) wide with undulating edges. The leaf surface is hairless with prominent veins.

=== Flowering clusters ===
45 to 400 flowers are set on a pyramid-shaped, branched flowering stalk (panicle). The main axis of the panicle arches upward, is stiff, straight and usually 15-29 cm long. It is hairless and often ribbed with light green or purple. About 25 to 30 spreading to ascending side branches are set at 2-15 mm intervals along the main axis of the panicle. The side branches are 6-15 cm long with 1 or 2 flowers at the base and others set at intervals of 1-4 mm, (up to 10 mm) along the branch.

=== Flowers and fruits ===
Flowers are set on stalks (pedicels) that are 2-5 mm long, deeply ribbed and hairless. The flowers in the common variety are made up of 3-5 mm long spreading tepals that are usually white, but sometimes have purple spots. There is a rare variety (var. crassipes) which has cup-shaped flowers and tepals that longer than the more common variety and that are yellow or yellow-white. Stamens are inserted at the base of the tepals. Fruits are rounded to weakly 3-lobed, 10-12 mm across, green mottled with red when immature, ripening to red. Flowering and fruiting occurs throughout the year

== Varieties ==
Two varieties are recognized: Maianthemum gigas var. crassipes (Standl. & Steyerm.) LaFrankie and Maianthemum gigas (Woodson) LaFrankie var. gigas. M. gigas var. crassipes is rare, has cup-shaped flowers and tepals that are yellow or yellow-white and 5-7 mm long by 3-3.5 mm wide. M. gigas var. gigas has flowers with white or white with lavender tepals that are spreading and 2.5-5 mm long by 1.5 - 2 mm wide.

== Distribution ==
Both M. gigas var. crassipes and M. gigas var. gigas have been found in Chiapas and Guatemala. M. gigas var. gigas is the more widespread variety, and has also been found in Costa Rica, Nicaragua and Panamá.

== Habitat and ecology ==
Terrestrial or epiphytic herbs found at a wide range of elevations from 900 m to over 3000 m. M. gigas var. crassipes is rare, but M. gigas var. gigas is widespread and has often been found growing on the ground in forest openings and along roadsides.
