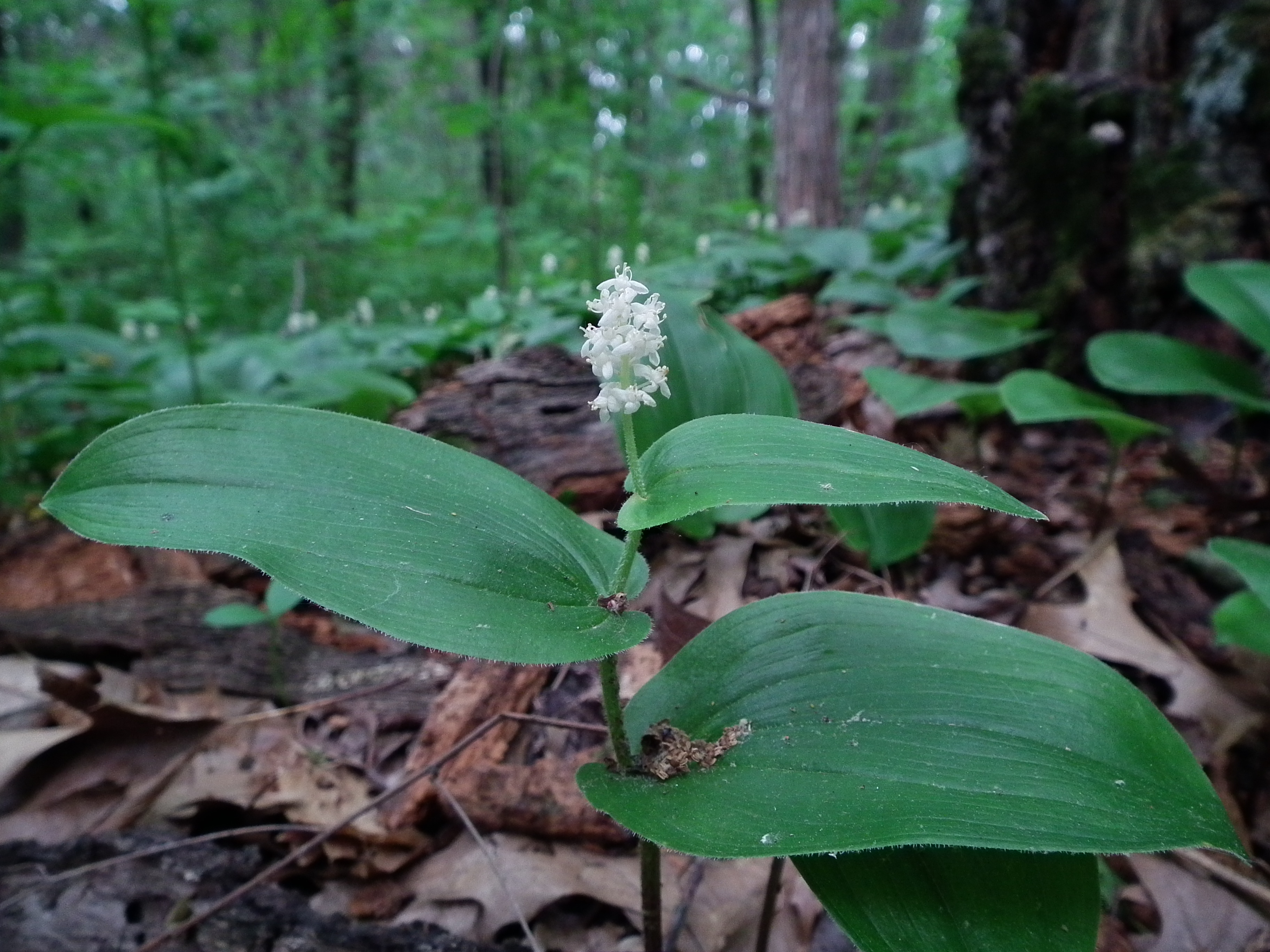

Conservation status
- Secure (NatureServe)

Scientific classification
- Kingdom: Plantae
- Clade: Tracheophytes
- Clade: Angiosperms
- Clade: Monocots
- Order: Asparagales
- Family: Asparagaceae
- Subfamily: Convallarioideae
- Genus: Maianthemum
- Species: M. canadense

Binomial name
- Maianthemum canadense Desf.

Synonyms
- Maianthemum canadense var. interius Fern.; Maianthemum canadense var. pubescens Gates & Ehlers; Unifolium canadense (Desf.) Greene

= Maianthemum canadense =

Species of flowering plant

Maianthemum canadense (Canadian may-lily, Canada mayflower, false lily-of-the-valley, Canadian lily-of-the-valley, wild lily-of-the-valley, two-leaved Solomon's seal) is an understory perennial flowering plant, native to Canada and the northeastern United States, from Yukon and British Columbia east to Newfoundland, into St. Pierre and Miquelon. It can be found growing in both coniferous and deciduous forests. The plant appears in two forms, either as a single leaf rising from the ground with no fruiting structures or as a flowering/fruiting stem with two to three leaves. Flowering shoots have clusters of 12–25 starry-shaped, white flowers held above the leaves.

The plant is rich in calcium and phosphorus and as such makes up the bulk of the diet of white-tailed deer in the northeastern United States in the spring, when lactating does and antler-growing bucks require extra amounts of those nutrients.

== Description ==
Plants grow to 10–25 cm (4–10 in) tall, arising from branching rhizomes that have roots only at the nodes. Plants may be one-leaved and without fruiting structures (sterile). the fertile, flowering shoots have 2–3 leaves.

=== Leaves ===
The leaf blades are 4.5–9 cm (2–4 in) long by 3–5.5 cm (1–2 in) wide with a pointed tip. The lowest leaves are usually egg-shaped with two lobes at the base and a narrow space (sinus) between the lobes. Upper leaves are usually heart-shaped and set on a short 1–7 mm long petiole.

=== Flowering clusters ===
The clusters of 12–25 starry-shaped, white flowers are set in a complex raceme - an unbranched flowering cluster that has 1-3 (usually 2) stalked flowers per node, set at roughly equal distances along a central axis. The lowest flowers open first. The flower stalks (pedicels) are 3–7 mm long and thin (0.2-0.5 mm wide).

=== Flowers and fruits ===
The flowers are produced from spring to mid summer. They have four conspicuous, white, 1.5–2 mm long tepals. The fruit is a berry containing one or two round seeds. The berries are 4–6 mm across, mottled red in early summer and turning deep red by mid summer. A seed is produced infrequently and most plants in a location are vegetative clones, spreading by their shallow, trailing, white rhizomes.

== Distribution ==
It is found in Canada from southeastern Yukon, southern Northwest Territories, into eastern British Columbia and east to Newfoundland and Labrador, and into St. Pierre and Miquelon. It is also found in the northern United States from the Dakotas east, south along the Appalachian Mountains and disjunct populations in Colorado, Wyoming, Nebraska and Kansas. It is possibly extirpated from Montana.

== Habitat and ecology ==
Primarily a boreal forest understory species, but also found at low elevation sites in the Rocky Mountains, to 1800 m. It is associated with moist woods but is also found in sandy pine woods in the north and can persist in clearings.

== Similar species ==
Although most Maianthemum have flower parts in sets of three, M. canadense plants have flowers with four tepals and four stamens, as in the very closely related Maianthemum bifolium and Maianthemum dilatatum. The range of these species do not overlap. M. bifolium is found in temperate Eurasia, and M. dilatatum is essentially a coastal species found from Alaska south to northwest California as well as Mongolia to Japan. Maianthemum trifolium is also a small herb and has a distribution similar to M. canadense, but the flower parts are in sets of 3s, the leaf bases are tapered, not heart-shaped; it is found in wet habitat such as bogs.

== Subspecies ==
No subspecies are currently recognized, although in the western half of the range plants with hairs and consistently larger leaves have been treated as var. interius.

== Gallery ==
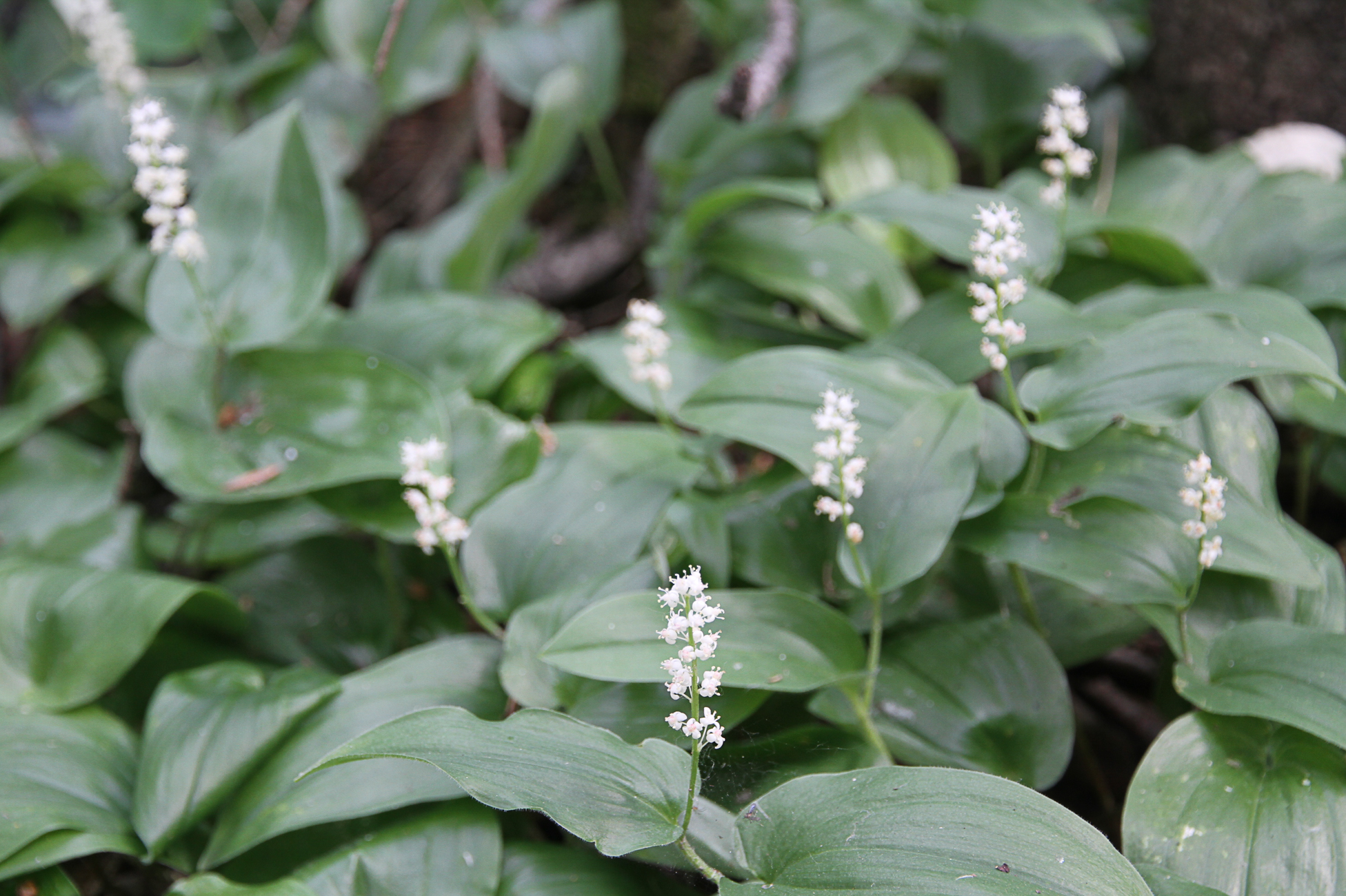
Flowers

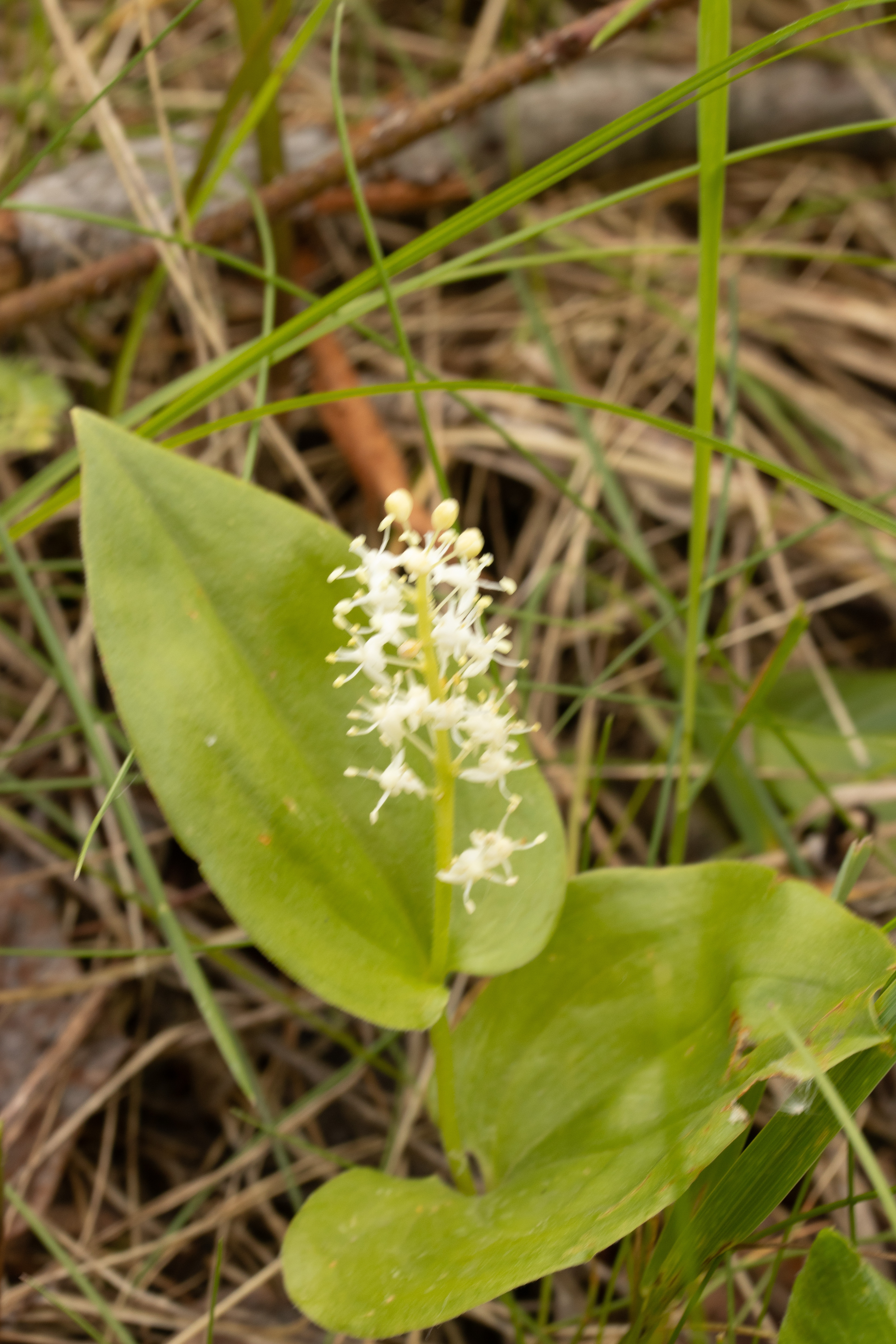
flowering

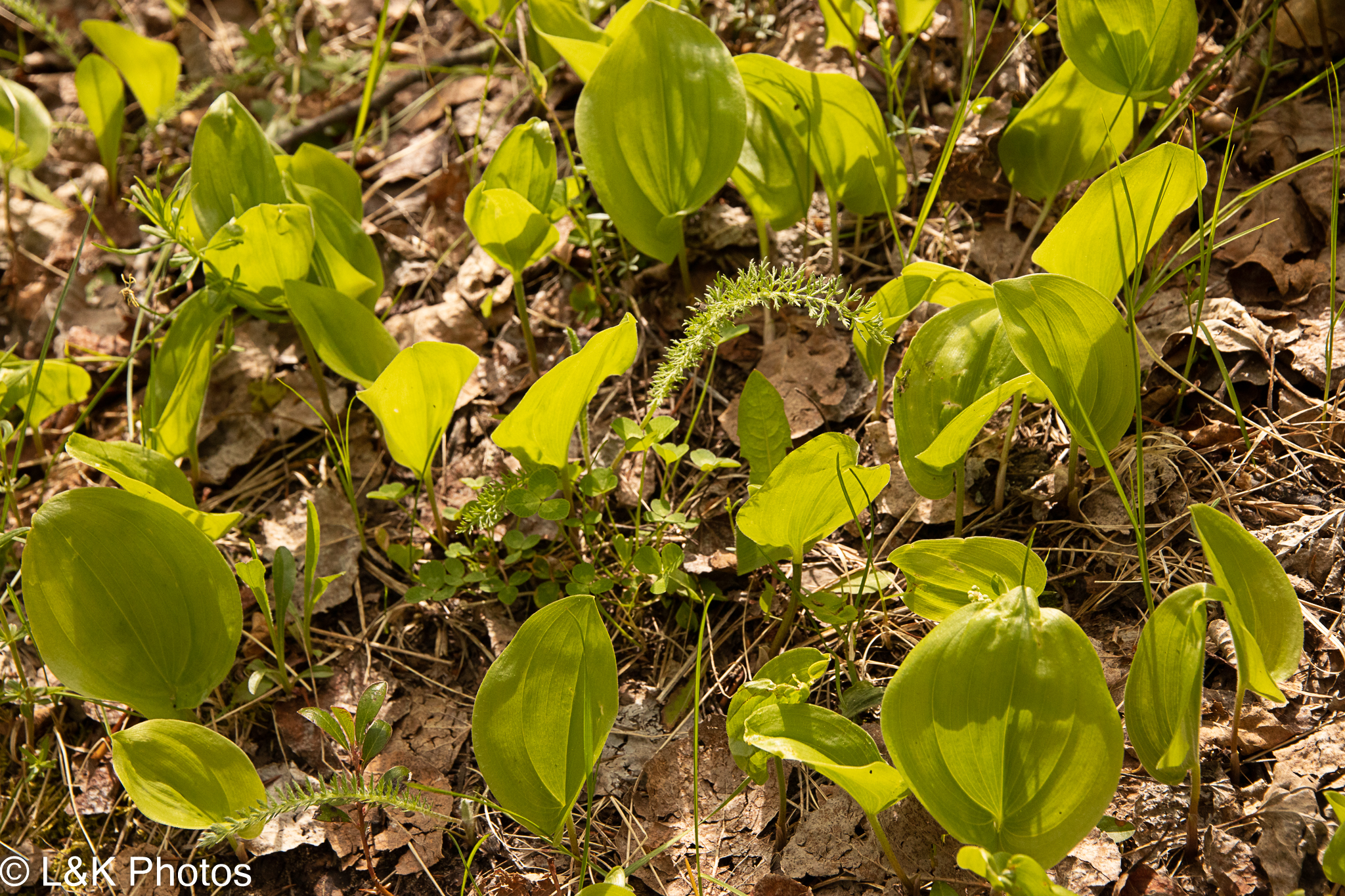
Leaves

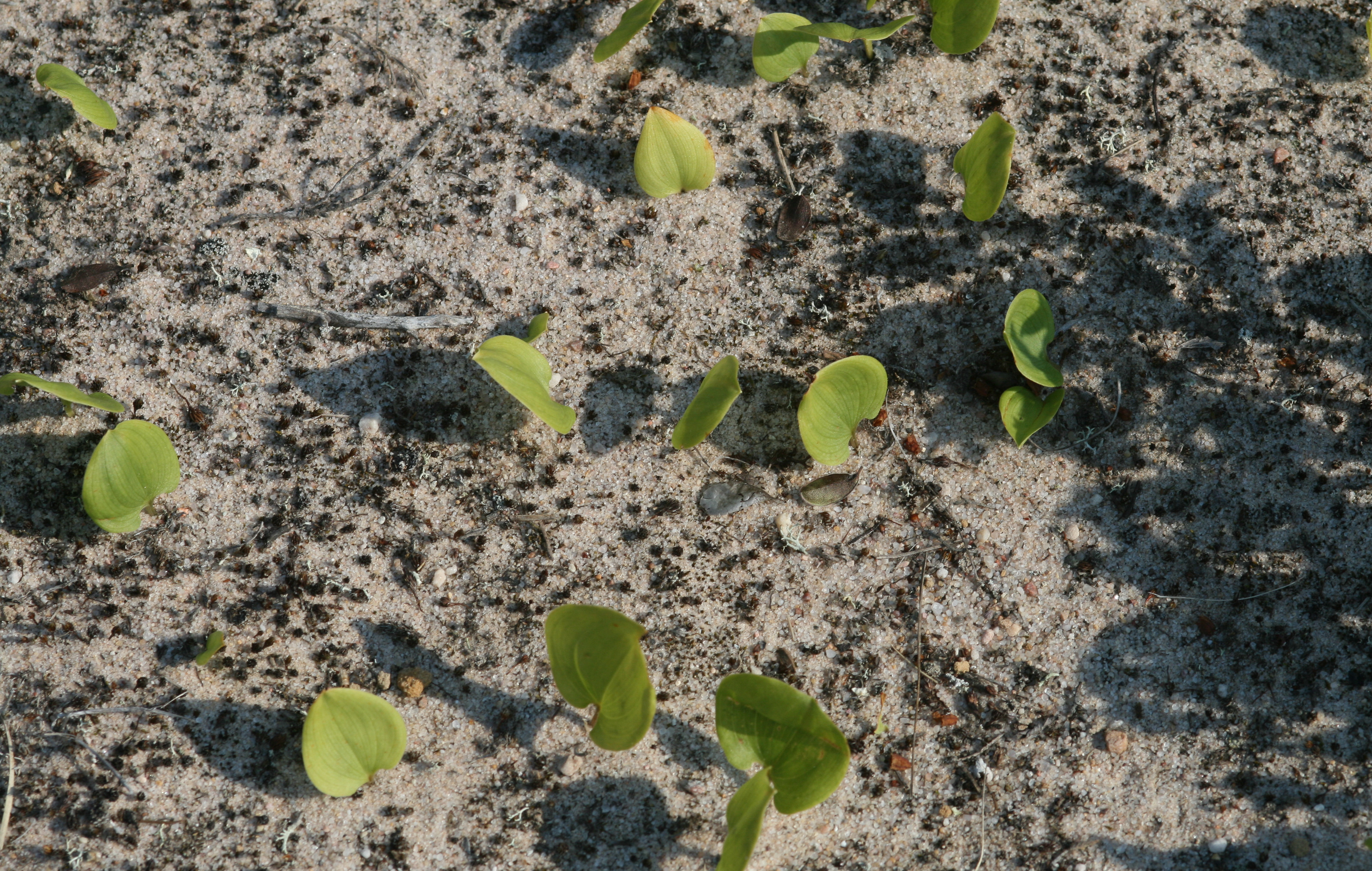
single leaves of sterile plants

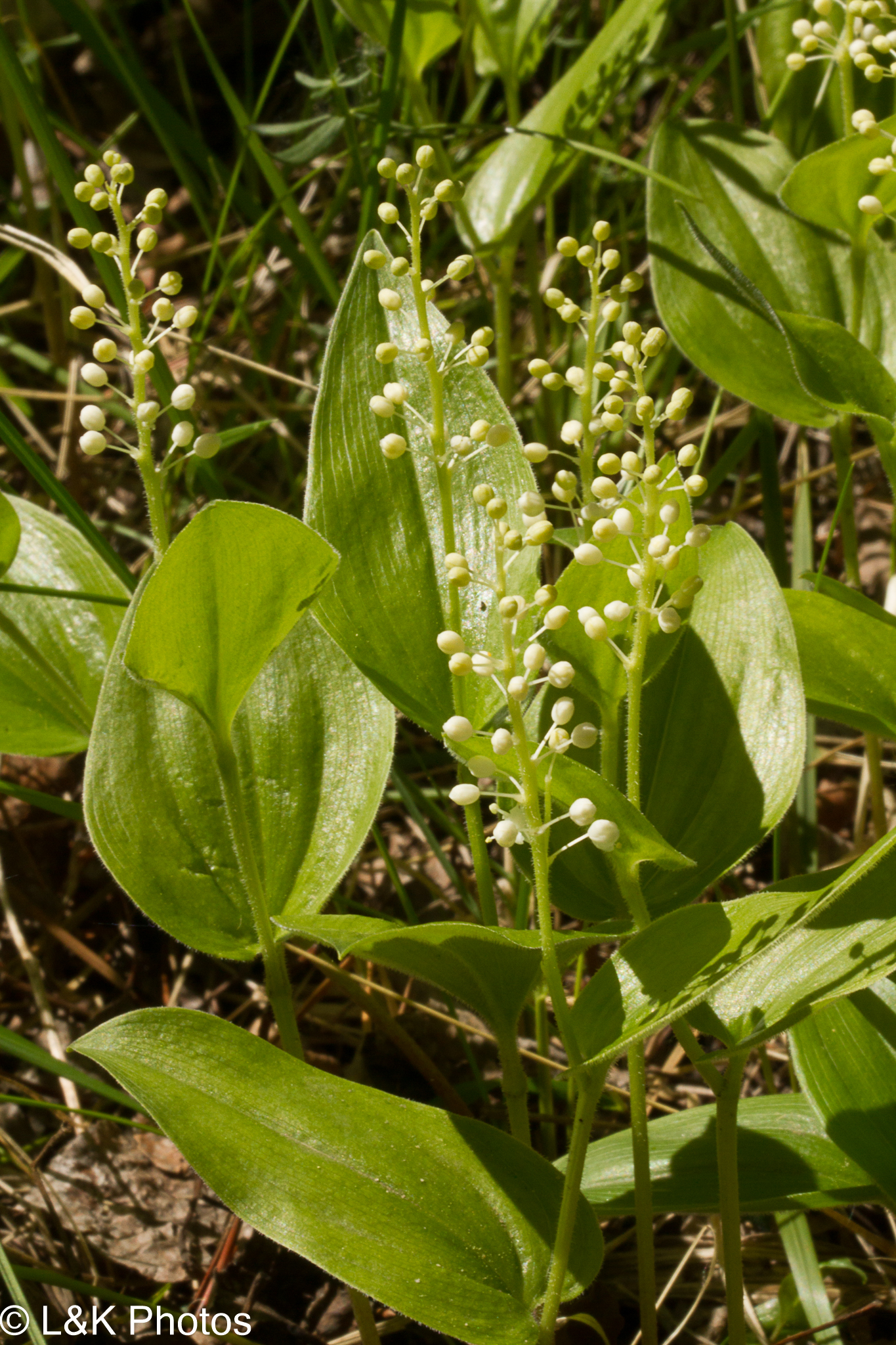
In bud

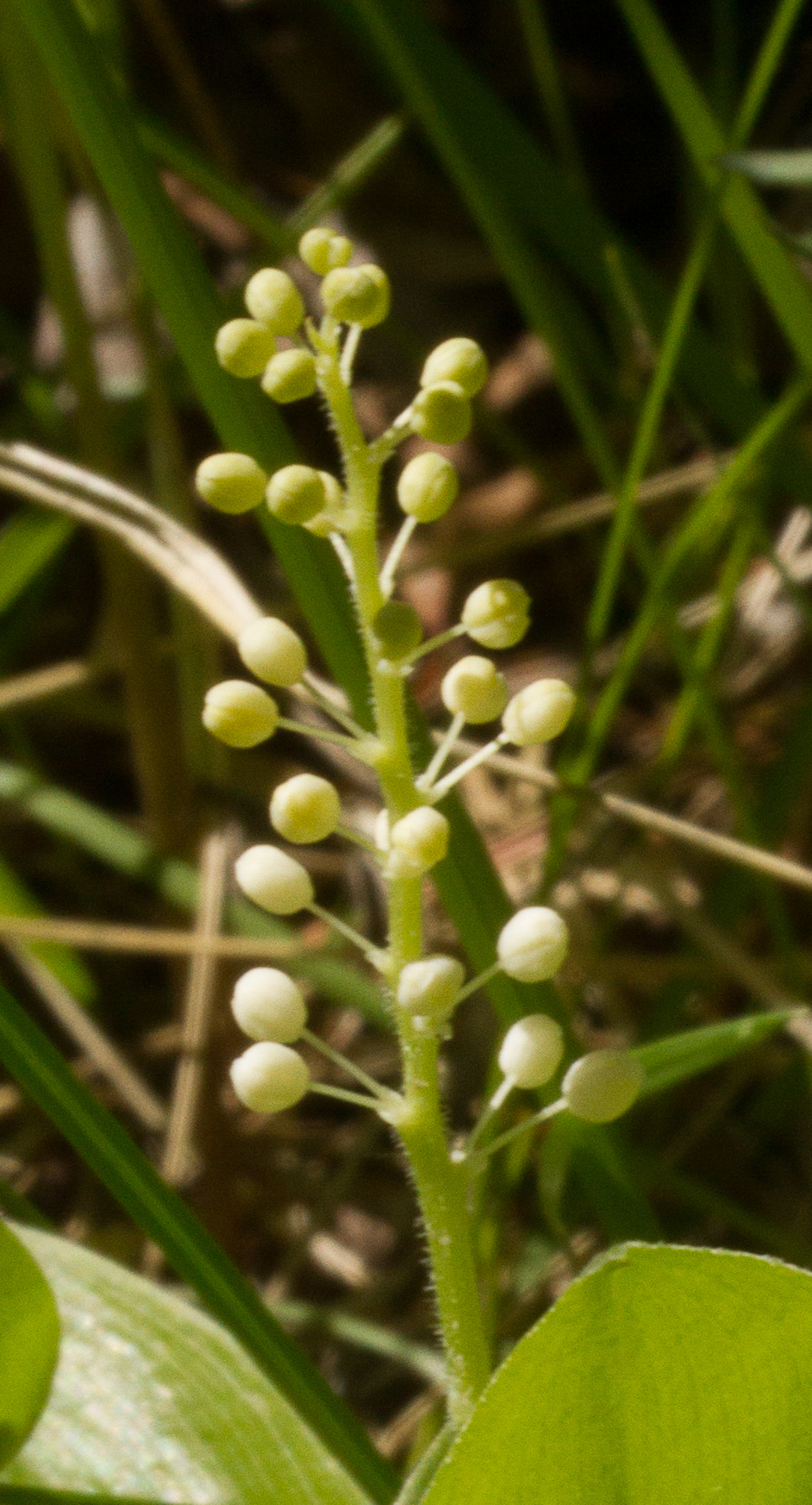
Complex raceme

== Bibliography ==
- Blanchan, Neltje (2002). Wild Flowers: An Aid to Knowledge of our Wild Flowers and their Insect Visitors. Project Gutenberg Literary Archive Foundation.
