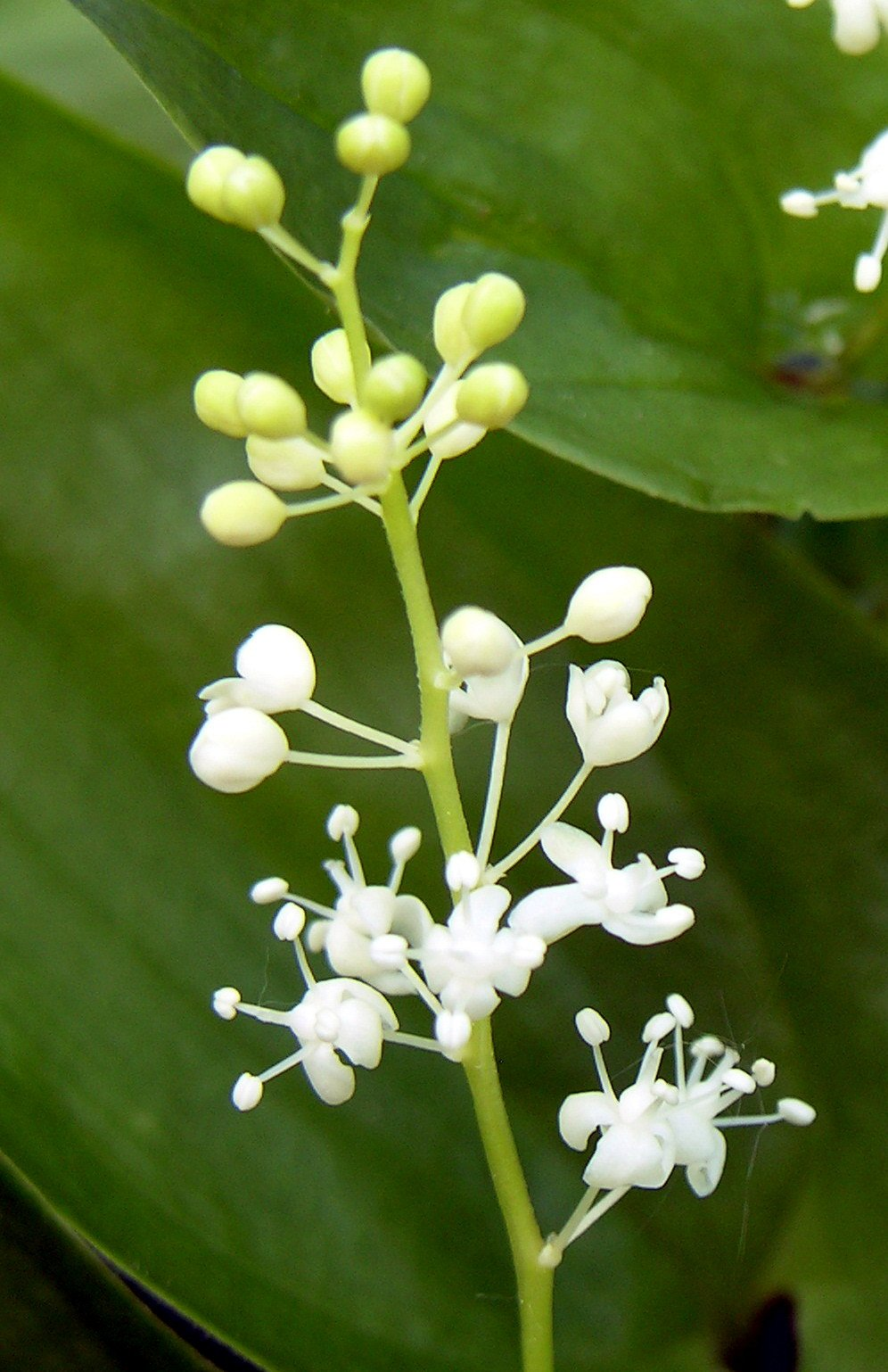

Scientific classification
- Kingdom: Plantae
- Clade: Embryophytes
- Clade: Tracheophytes
- Clade: Angiosperms
- Clade: Monocots
- Order: Asparagales
- Family: Asparagaceae
- Subfamily: Convallarioideae
- Genus: Maianthemum
- Species: M. bifolium

Binomial name
- Maianthemum bifolium (L.) F.W.Schmidt

= Maianthemum bifolium =

Species of flowering plant

Maianthemum bifolium (false lily of the valley or May lily) is often a localized common rhizomatous flowering plant, native from western Europe (including Britain) east to Siberia, China and Japan.

== Description ==
Non-flowering stems usually have only one waxy leaf, but on flowering plants there is one basal leaf that withers away before flowering, and two stem leaves produced alternately up the 10–20 cm tall stems, which are topped off with many star-shaped white flowers. The leaves are heart to triangular, 3–8 cm long and 2–5 cm broad, with small fine hairs on the veins. The flowers have four tepals, four stamens and have two chambers in the pistil; flowering is in mid spring to early summer. This species, along with Maianthemum canadense and Maianthemum dilatatum are the only four-tepaled species within the Maianthemum genus. One to two seeds are produced in round, initially green berries that are speckled red when immature and turn completely red with age. The whole plant, including the berries contains cardiac glycosides and just a few grams can be poisonous to humans when ingested. It is considered safe to touch.

Its fruit persists for an average of 100 days, and bears an average of 1.8 seeds per fruit. Fruits average 71.1% water, and their dry weight includes 26.9% carbohydrates and 0.5% lipids.

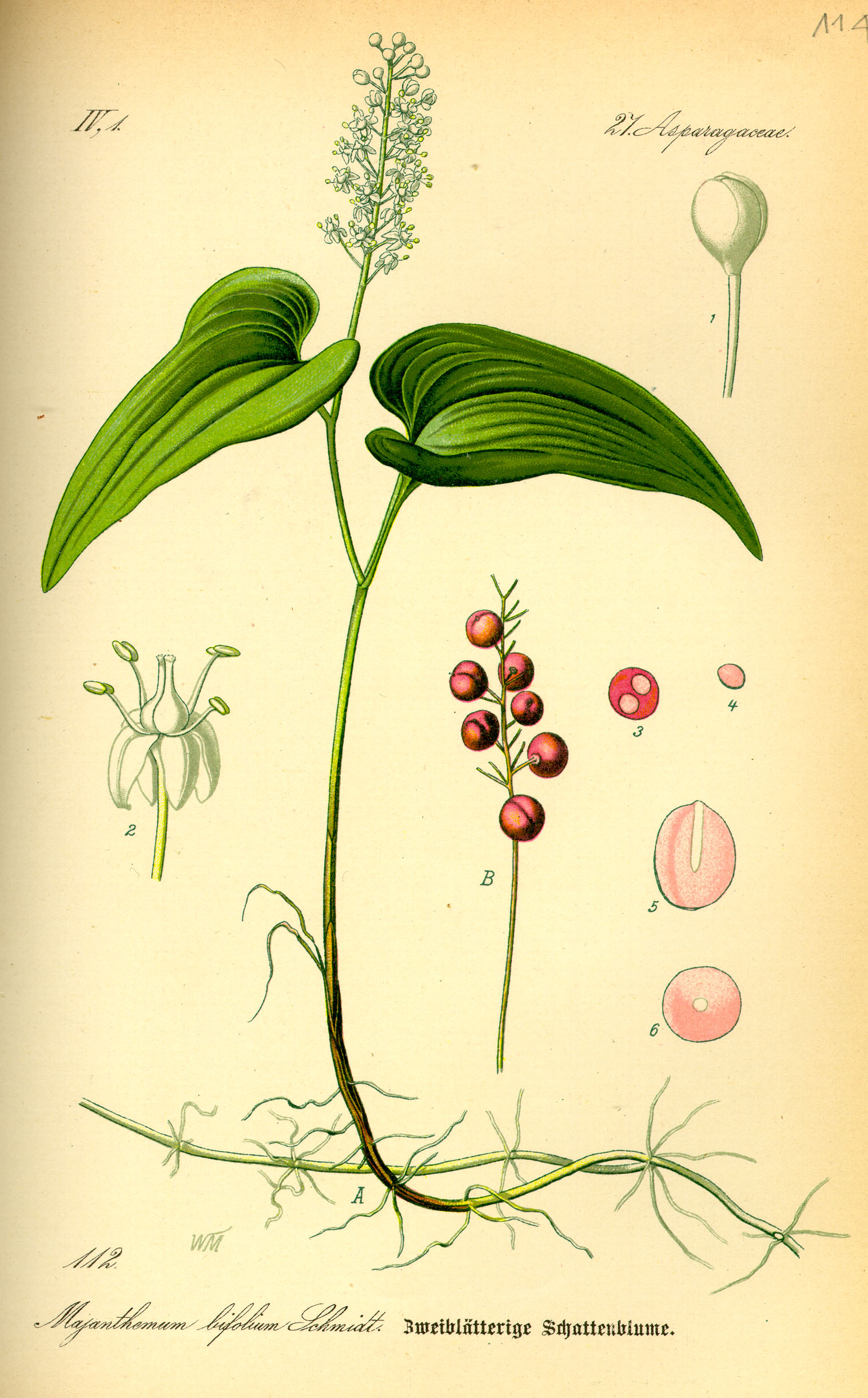

== Distribution and habitat ==
This species grows in large groups in open forests and on damp soils in grassy ditches and thickets, particularly in humus-rich soil. It prefers partial shade, well drained and slightly acidic soil.

== Bibliography ==
- Ehrlén, Johan; Eriksson, Ove (1991). "Phenological variation in fruit characteristics in vertebrate-dispersed plants". Oecologia. 86 (4): 463–470. doi:10.1007/BF00318311. ISSN 0029-8549.
