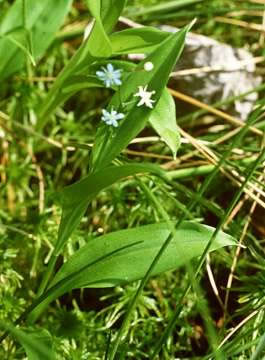

Conservation status
- Secure (NatureServe)

Scientific classification
- Kingdom: Plantae
- Clade: Tracheophytes
- Clade: Angiosperms
- Clade: Monocots
- Order: Asparagales
- Family: Asparagaceae
- Subfamily: Convallarioideae
- Genus: Maianthemum
- Species: M. trifolium

Binomial name
- Maianthemum trifolium (L.) Sloboda

Synonyms
- Asteranthemum trifoliatum Kunth; Asteranthemum trifolium (L.) Nieuwl.; Convallaria trifolia L.; Smilacina trifolia (L.) Desf.; Tovaria trifolia (L.) Neck. ex Baker; Unifolium trifolium (L.) Greene; Vagnera pumila Standl.; Vagnera trifolia (L.) Morong; Vagnera trifolia f. bifolia Farw.; Vagnera trifolia f. unifolia Farw.

= Maianthemum trifolium =

Species of flowering plant

Maianthemum trifolium (Three-leaf Solomon's-seal, three-leaf Solomon's-plume, threeleaf false lily of the valley, smilacine trifoliée) is a species of flowering plant that is associated with extremely wet environments and is native to Canada and the northeastern United States as well as St. Pierre and Miquelon and Asia (Siberia).

== Description ==
It is a herbaceous perennial plant growing erect, 10–25 cm (4–10 in) tall. It grows off spreading sympodial rhizomes with roots found only at nodes. New plants produce two petiolate foliage leaves the first year, then a flowering shoot the second year with 2-4 sessile leaves.

=== Leaves ===
Fertile plants have 2-4 alternate leaves that are elliptic, 5–12 cm (1.97–4.72 in) long and 2.5–4 cm (1–1 1/2 in) broad. Leaf bases are narrowly tapered and tips pointed.

=== Flowering clusters ===
5 to 15 flowers are produced on a simple raceme 5–10 cm (2–4 in) long. There is only one flower per node, set on a 1–3 mm (0.04–0.12 in) long pedicel.

=== Flowers and fruits ===
Flowers are trimerous, that is, flower parts are in groups of three. Each flower has 6 white tepals 2–4 mm (0.08–0.16 in) long. Fruits are berries 4–6 mm (0.16–0.24 in) wide, mottled with fine red spots when young, maturing to red. Berries contain 1-3 small, rounded seeds. Flowering is May to June, berries remain on plants into September.

== Distribution ==
Found in all Canadian provinces and territories and in the US in some northeastern states (Connecticut, Maine, Massachusetts, Michigan, Minnesota, New Hampshire, New Jersey, New York, Ohio, Pennsylvania, Rhode Island, Vermont, and Wisconsin). Also found in St. Pierre and Miquelon and Asia (Siberia).

== Habitat and ecology ==
Maianthemum trifolium often forms dense patches in wet forests, sphagnum bogs and other wetlands and is sometimes considered to be aquatic.

== Gallery ==
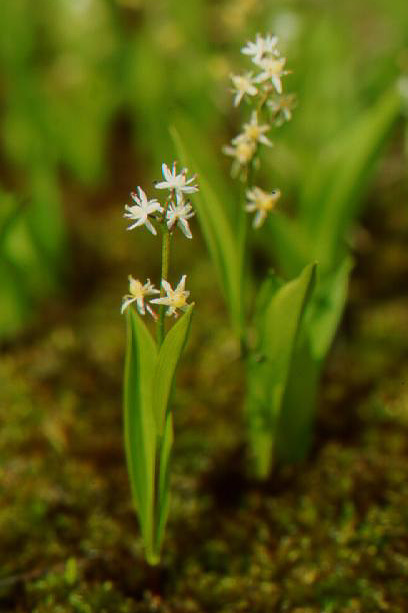
plants with flowers
