= Maianthemum amoenum =

Scientific classification
- Kingdom: Plantae
- Clade: Tracheophytes
- Clade: Angiosperms
- Clade: Monocots
- Order: Asparagales
- Family: Asparagaceae
- Subfamily: Nolinoideae
- Genus: Maianthemum
- Species: M. amoenum

Binomial name
- Maianthemum amoenum (H.L.Wendl.) LaFrankie

Synonyms
- Smilacina amoena H.L.Wendl.

Species of flowering plant

Maianthemum amoenum is a perennial flowering plant, growing as an epiphyte on trees in cloud forests from Mexico south to Honduras.

== Description ==
Plants are 0.5–0.8 m (20–31 in) tall. Roots grow scattered evenly along densely clumped, rounded rhizomes. Stems are leaning to upright, usually with 6 to 9 leaves (sometimes up to 11), set 2–5 cm (1–2 in) apart.

=== Leaves ===
Leaves usually clasp the stalk; some may have a short (2 mm (0.079 in) long) petiole. Leaf blades are egg-shaped with pointed tips and veins are prominent. The leaf surface is hairless and shiny.

=== Flowering clusters ===
25 to 75 flowers are set on a branched flowering stalk (panicle). The main axis of the panicle is usually 4-6 cm long, stiff and straight. It is hairless and often red or with red patches. The side branches of the panicle are short (1-2 cm long) and arranged in a helix. They start off ascending, but become spreading as the flowers bloom. Each side branch has 3-5 flowers, with one flower set close to the base of the branch and the others set on 1-2 cm long stalks (pedicels) at about 4mm intervals along the branch.

=== Flowers and fruits ===
The flowers are cup-shaped and made up of lavender to pink-white tepals up to 6.5 mm long with stamens inserted at the base. Fruits are rounded to 3-lobed, 5-8mm across, green ripening to red. Flowering occurs from January to April and fruits remain on the plant into October.

== Distribution ==
It has been found in El Salvador, Guatemala (the Totonicapán area), Honduras and in the Veracruz, Oaxaca, Chiapas states of Mexico.

== Habitat and ecology ==
Maianthemum amoenum usually grows as an epiphyte on canopy trees of the cloud forest at 2300 - 3300 m elevation. Plants are usually found 5–15 m (16–49 ft) or more above the ground, but sometimes persist in blow-downs. They can form dense clumps covering canopy trees such as Quercus and Drimys.
