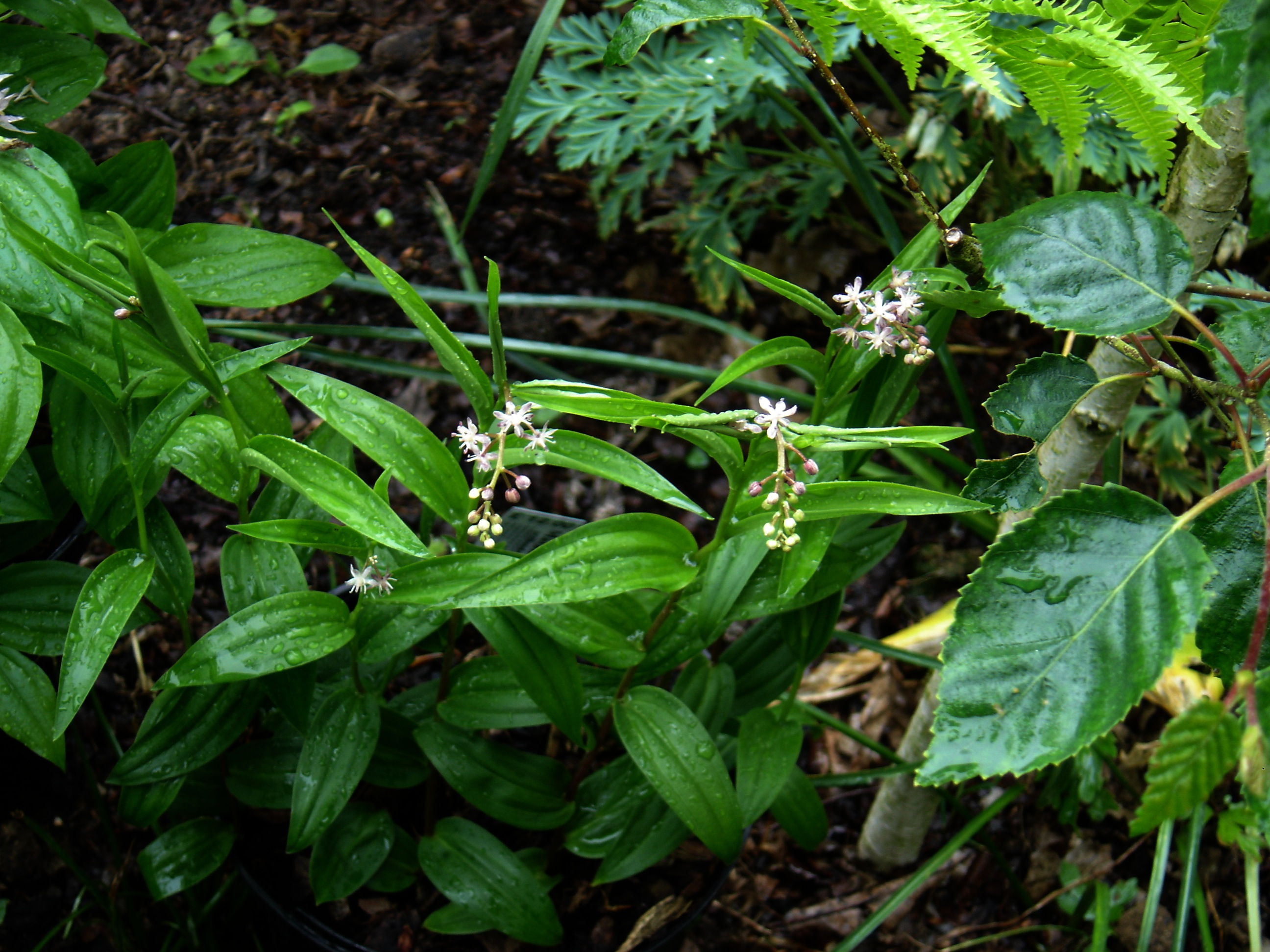

Scientific classification
- Kingdom: Plantae
- Clade: Tracheophytes
- Clade: Angiosperms
- Clade: Monocots
- Order: Asparagales
- Family: Asparagaceae
- Subfamily: Convallarioideae
- Genus: Maianthemum
- Species: M. scilloideum

Binomial name
- Maianthemum scilloideum (M.Martens & Galeotti) LaFrankie

Synonyms
- Smilacina scilloidea M.Martens & Galeotti; Smilacina scilloidea var. acutifolia M.Martens & Galeotti; Smilacina scilloidea var. rosea Emons; Tovaria scilloides(M.Martens & Galeotti) Baker

= Maianthemum scilloideum =

Species of flowering plant

Maianthemum scilloideum is a perennial flowering plant. It is a terrestrial forest herb from southern Mexico and Guatemala and also reported from Honduras.

== Description ==
Plants from 15–35 cm (6–14 in) tall from forked, widely spreading rhizomes with roots clumped near the base of leafy shoots. Stems are leafy, upright, hairless and smooth or ribbed. There are 6-9 leaves set 2.5–5 cm (1–2 in) apart; more closely spaced near the tip of the plant.

=== Leaves ===
Leaves are 5–8 cm (2–3 in) long by 2–3.5 cm (1–1 in) wide. They are either sessile and clasping or have a short, 2–3 mm long petiole. Leaf blades are hairless, shiny, oval to egg-shaped with pointed tips and rounded bases and with flat (not undulating) edges. The veins are evident.

=== Flowering clusters ===
8 to 27 flowers are set in a complex raceme with a main axis 1.4 – 4 cm long that droops at first, becoming erect. The axis is ribbed, green or maroon and usually smooth. There are 4 to 8 nodes along the main axis, 2–7 mm apart and arraigned in a helix around the main axis. Each node has 2 to 3 (sometimes 4) flowers set on spreading pedicels that are usually 3.5 to 8 mm long.

=== Flowers and fruits ===
The flowers have spreading white tepals 3–6 mm long. Stamens are inserted at the base of the tepals. Fruits are rounded, 6–8 mm across, green when immature, ripening to red. Flowering is from April to August, fruits are retained June to December.

== Distribution ==
Maianthemum scilloideum has been documented in Guatemala, in Honduras (La Paz) and in Mexico in the states of Chiapas, Coahuila, Guerrero, Michoacán, Nuevo León, Oaxaca, Puebla and Veracruz.

== Habitat and ecology ==
It has been found at sites from 1400 to 3500 m elevation. It is a terrestrial herb forming loose colonies in understories of confier-oak forests.

== Bibliography ==
- LaFrankie (October 1986). "Morphology and taxonomy of the new world species of Maianthemum (Liliaceae)". Journal of the Arnold Arboretum. 67 (4): 371–439. doi:10.5962/bhl.part.27393.
