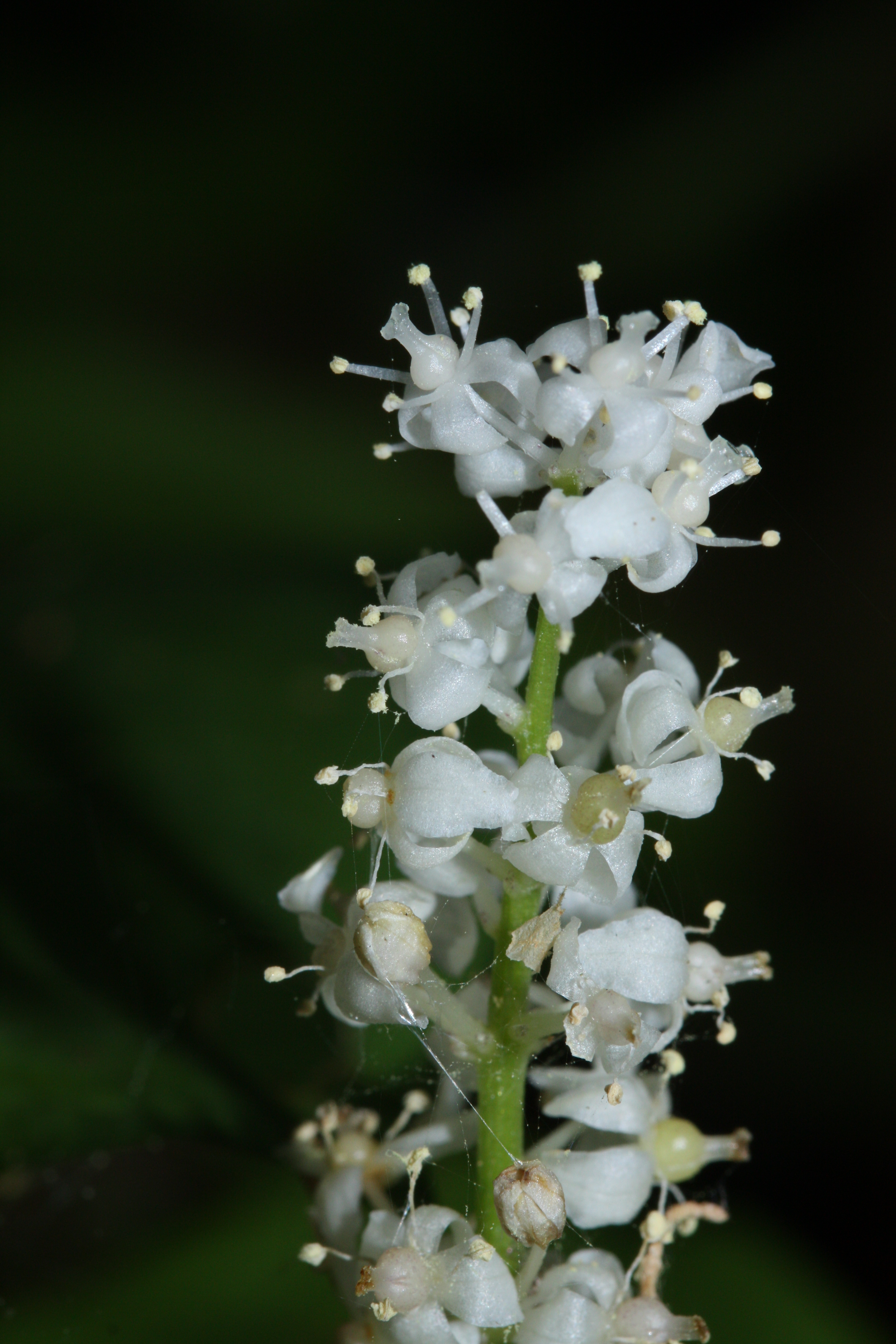

Conservation status
- Secure (NatureServe)

Scientific classification
- Kingdom: Plantae
- Clade: Tracheophytes
- Clade: Angiosperms
- Clade: Monocots
- Order: Asparagales
- Family: Asparagaceae
- Subfamily: Convallarioideae
- Genus: Maianthemum
- Species: M. dilatatum

Binomial name
- Maianthemum dilatatum (Alph.Wood) A.Nelson & J.F.Macbr.

Synonyms
- Synonymy: Maianthemum bifolium var. dilatatum Alph.Wood; Smilacina dilatata (Alph.Wood) Nutt. ex Baker; Unifolium dilatatum (Alph.Wood) Greene; Convallaria bifolia var. kamtschatica J.F.Gmel.; Maianthemum bifolium var. kamtschaticum (J.F.Gmel.) Trautv. & C.A.Mey.; Maianthemum bifolium subsp. kamtschaticum (J.F.Gmel.) A.E.Murray; Maianthemum bifolium var. pumilum J.M.H.Shaw; Maianthemum kamtschaticum (J.F.Gmel.) Nakai; Smilacina bifolia var. kamtschatica (J.F.Gmel.) Ledeb.; Unifolium bifolium subsp. kamtschaticum (J.F.Gmel.) Piper; Unifolium kamtschaticum (J.F.Gmel.) Gorman

= Maianthemum dilatatum =

Species of flowering plant

Maianthemum dilatatum (snakeberry, two-leaved Solomon's seal, deer heart, false lily of the valley, or western lily of the valley) is a common rhizomatous perennial flowering plant that is native to western North America from northern California to the Aleutian Islands, and Asia across the Kamchatka Peninsula, Japan, and Korea. It grows in coastal temperate rainforests, and is often the dominant groundcover plant in Sitka Spruce forests.

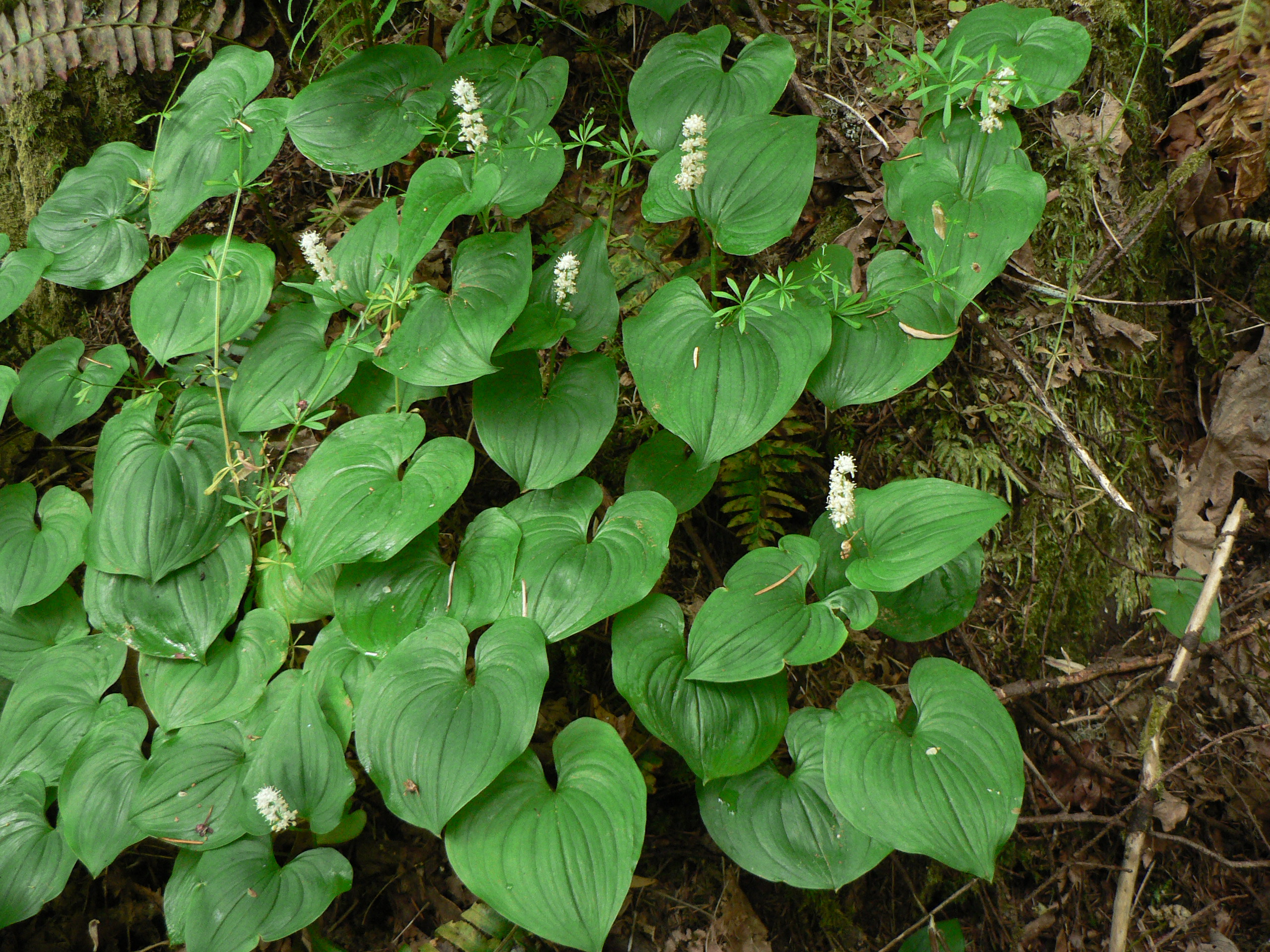
M. dilatatum, Squak Mountain State Park, Issaquah, Washington

== Description ==
The plant produces an erect, unbranched flower stem, occasionally to 40 centimeters in height, but typically much shorter. A non-flowering shoot bears one smooth, waxy, shiny leaf up to 10 centimeters long and 5 to 8 cm broad, hence its scientific name (dilatatum means 'broad'). The leaf is oval in shape with a heart-shaped base.

The inflorescence is an erect raceme with star-shaped white flowers. They each have four tepals and four stamens. After fertilization the fruit produced is a berry 6 millimeters in diameter. The berry is speckled red when immature and solid red when ripe. Each has 1 to 4 seeds. The leaf is green and shaped like a tear drop.

== Uses ==
The plant has many ethnobotanical uses. The roots and leaves were used medicinally, and the berries were occasionally used for food. Native Americans used the plant to treat wounds and eyestrain.

Being tolerant of deep shade, drought, and extensive watering, the plant is becoming more popular as a shade groundcover in gardening. Care should be taken when using it in gardens as it can quickly escape confines with its creeping rhizomes and may crowd out other plants.
