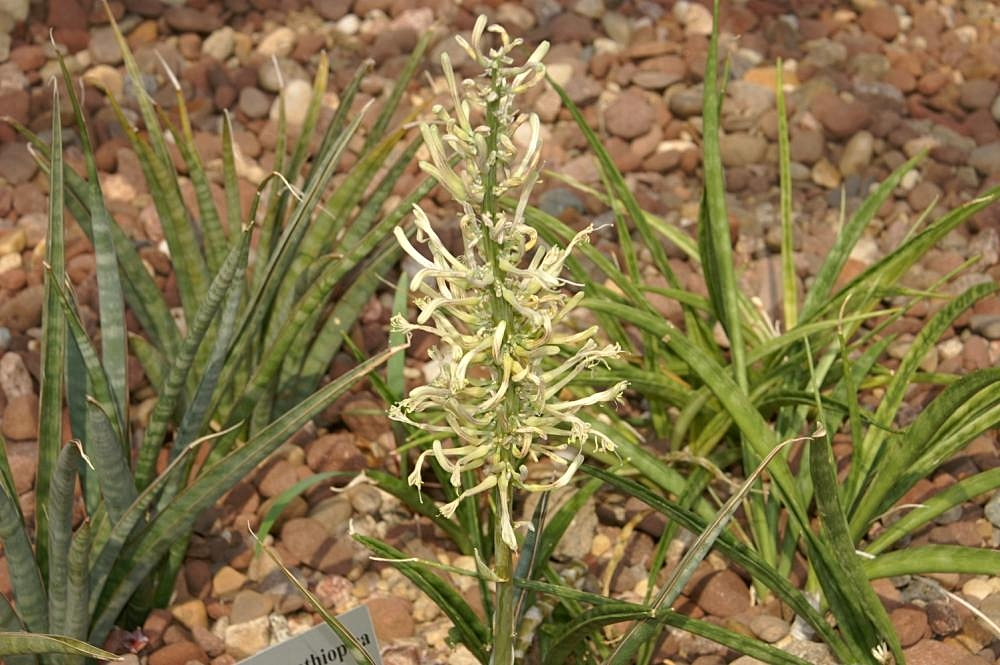
- D. aethiopica inflorescence

Scientific classification
- Kingdom: Plantae
- Clade: Tracheophytes
- Clade: Angiosperms
- Clade: Monocots
- Order: Asparagales
- Family: Asparagaceae
- Subfamily: Nolinoideae
- Genus: Dracaena
- Species: D. aethiopica

Binomial name
- Dracaena aethiopica (Thunb.) Byng & Christenh.

Synonyms
- Sansevieria aethiopica

= Dracaena aethiopica =

Species of plant

Dracaena aethiopica is a species of succulent plant widely distributed in Southern Africa. Its binomial name—aethiopica—refers to its origins in Africa. A highly variable species, it grows in desert or dry shrubland (like many in its genus) and spreads rhizomatically. The leaves grow in rosettes and may be up to 70 centimetres (2.3 ft) tall. Genetically, this species is most closely related to Dracaena ballyi. In Africa, this species has been used to augment poisons for hunting and fishing purposes.
