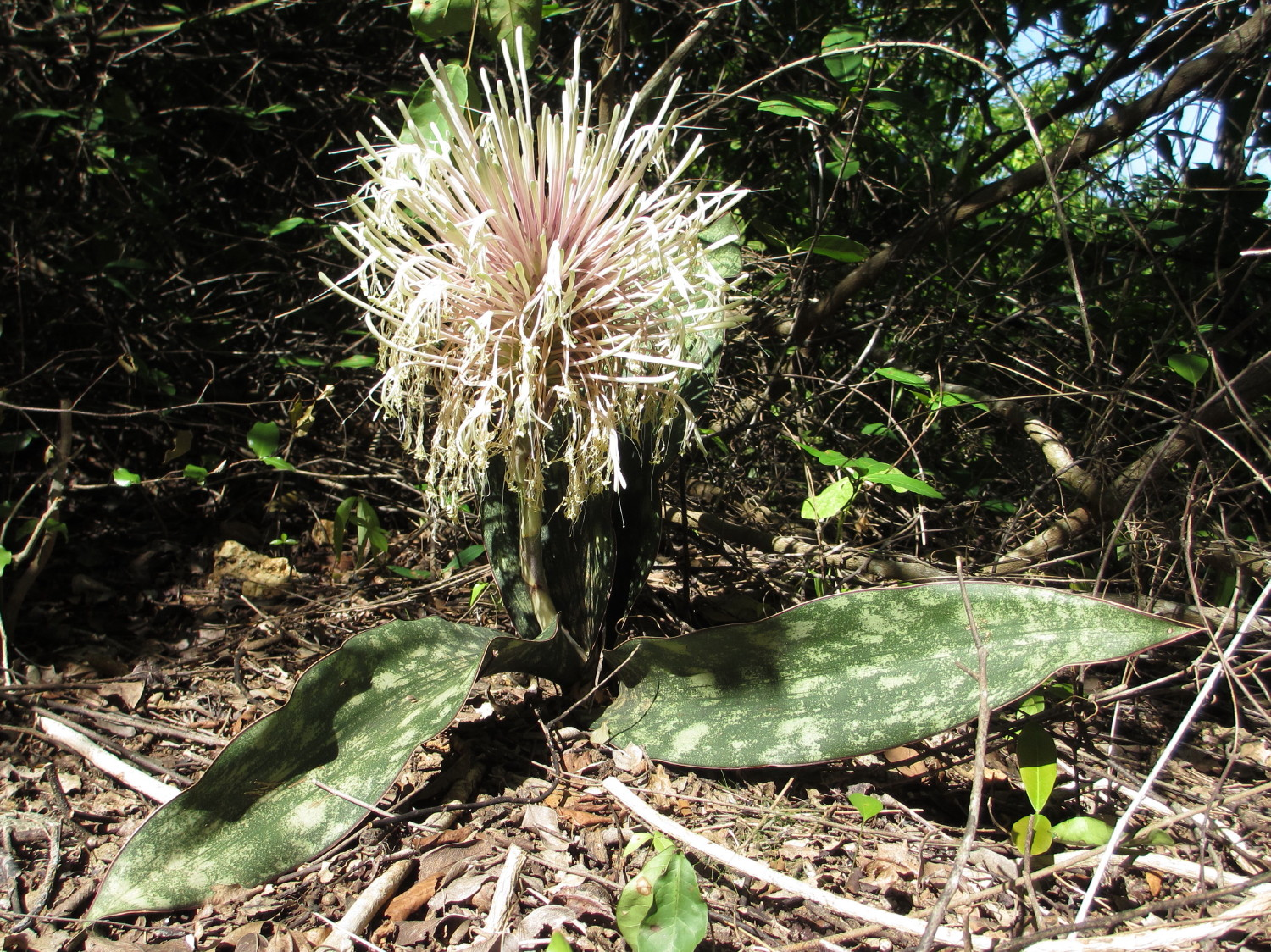

Scientific classification
- Kingdom: Plantae
- Clade: Tracheophytes
- Clade: Angiosperms
- Clade: Monocots
- Order: Asparagales
- Family: Asparagaceae
- Subfamily: Nolinoideae
- Genus: Dracaena
- Species: D. pethera

Binomial name
- Dracaena pethera Byng & Christenh.

Synonyms
- Sansevieria kirkii Baker

= Dracaena pethera =

Species of flowering plant

Dracaena pethera, synonym Sansevieria kirkii, also known as the star sansevieria or the snake plant, is a succulent plant native to Tanzania and the surrounding region in East Africa.

== Description ==
The leaves are flattened and thick (at least 9 mm), with wavy edges.

Dracaena pethera grows stemless as a perennial, succulent plant with strong rhizomes. The simple leaf blade is from 7.5 to 27.5 inches long and from 6 to 9 inches wide. It gradually narrows from about the middle into a 8.5—12.7 millimeter long pale whitish brown and hard spider tip. The leaves are whitish brown, greyish green, speckled or light green transversely banded, with three to nine dark green longitudinal lines. The leaf margin is wavy and reddish brown. The leaf surface is smooth. The pulchra variety has clearly more marked and partially prostrate leaves, with whitish green, buff-colored or almost reddish spots or irregular bands.

The flower of Dracaena pethera is greenish-white, scented, and is carried on a conical inflorescence.

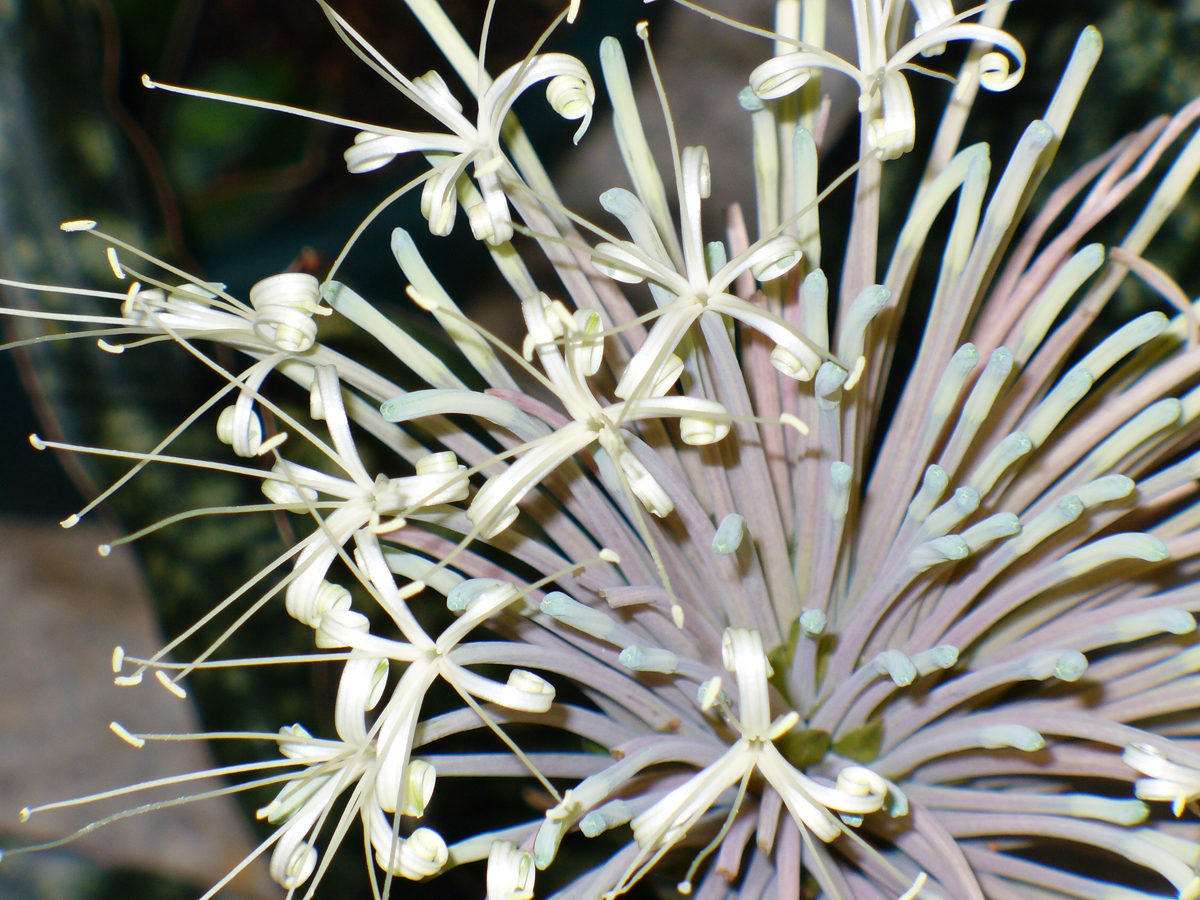
Flowers

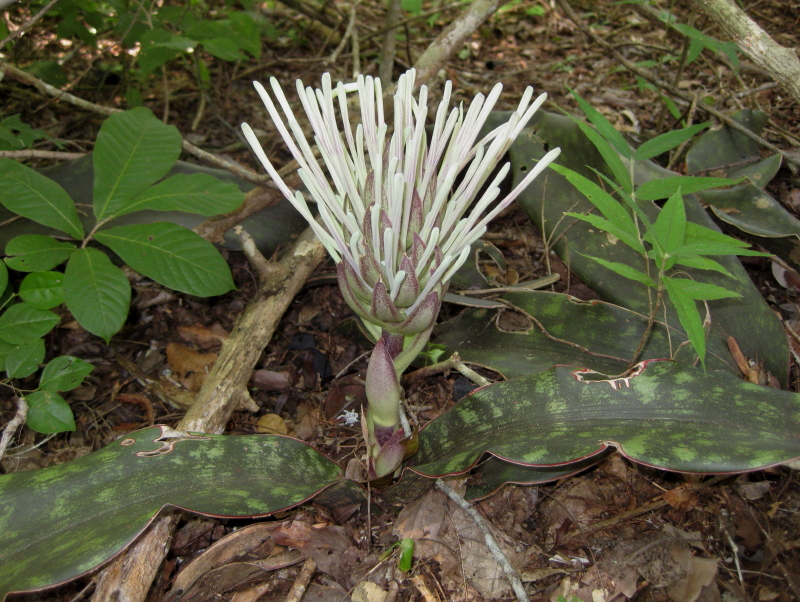
In habitat

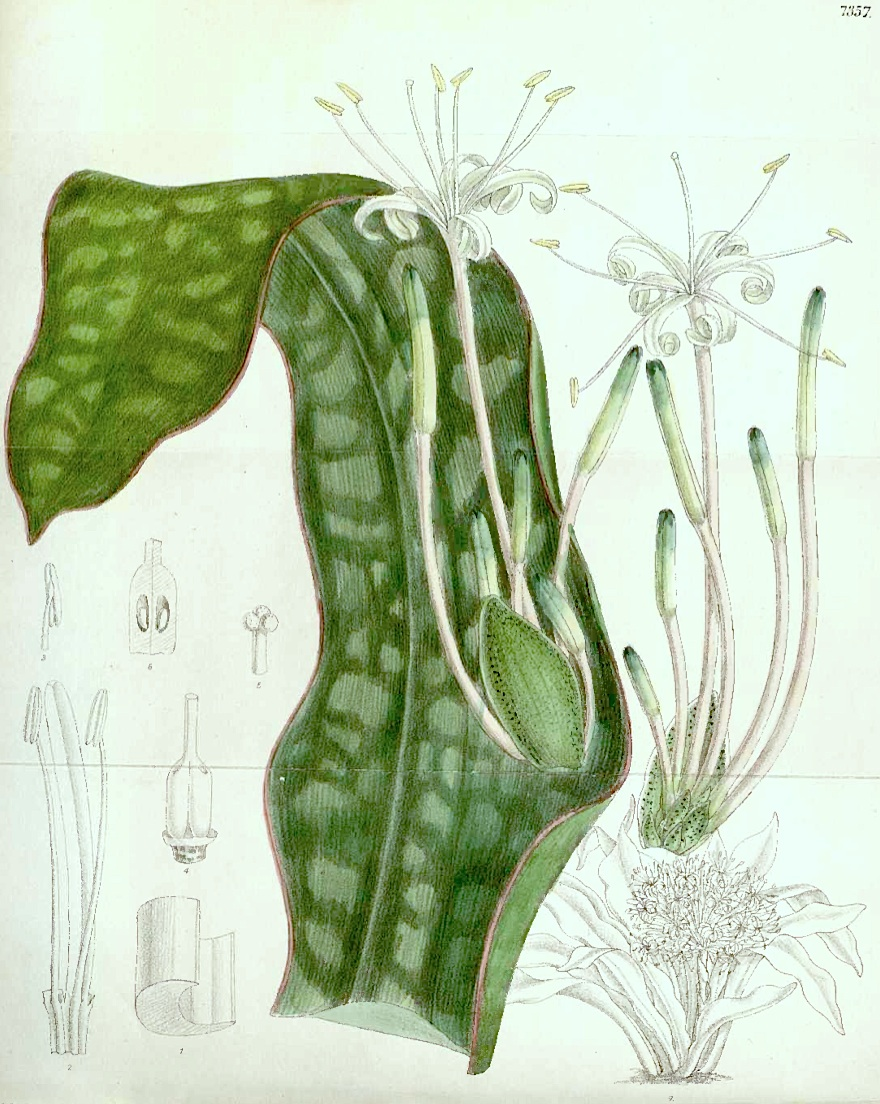
Botanical illustration
