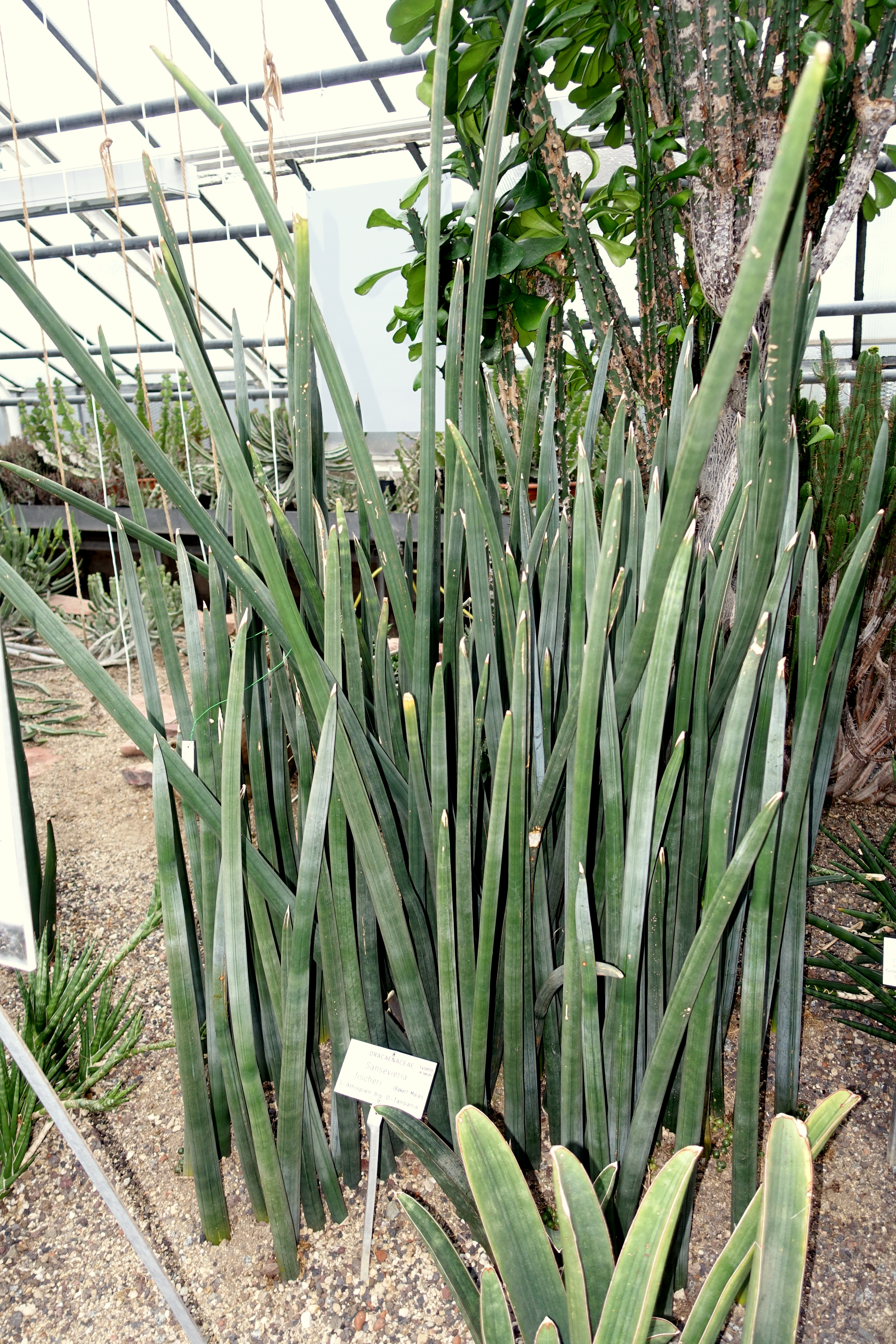
- Dracaena singularis growing at the Botanical Garden of the University of Heidelberg

Scientific classification
- Kingdom: Plantae
- Clade: Tracheophytes
- Clade: Angiosperms
- Clade: Monocots
- Order: Asparagales
- Family: Asparagaceae
- Subfamily: Convallarioideae
- Genus: Dracaena
- Species: D. singularis

Binomial name
- Dracaena singularis (N.E.Br.) Byng & Christenh.

Synonyms
- Sansevieria fischeri, Sansevieria singularis

= Dracaena singularis =

Species of plant

Dracaena singularis is a species of succulent plant in the genus Dracaena native to Ethiopia, Kenya, and Tanzania. Initially mistakenly placed in the genus Boophane at first, by the 1980s the plant was reclassified into the genus Sanseviera, until that entire genus was merged with Dracaena. The species is named singularis because at its mature size, it has only a single leaf up to 1.8 metres (5.9 ft) in length, while in a juvenile state it displays small rosettes of several leaves.
