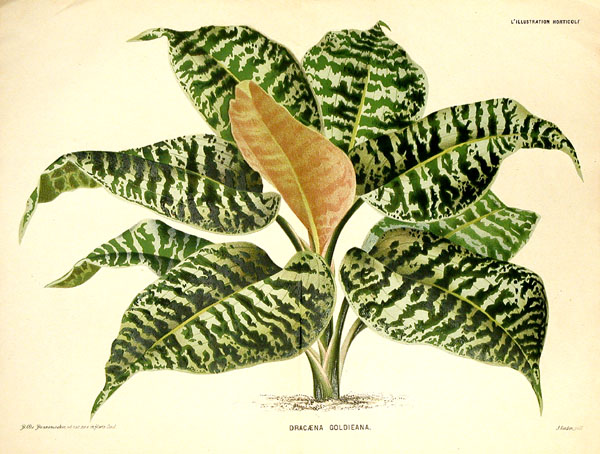
- From L'Illustration Horticole, 1878, Vol. 25: Revue Mensuelle Des Serres Et Des Jardins (Plate 300)

Scientific classification
- Kingdom: Plantae
- Clade: Tracheophytes
- Clade: Angiosperms
- Clade: Monocots
- Order: Asparagales
- Family: Asparagaceae
- Subfamily: Convallarioideae
- Genus: Dracaena
- Species: D. goldieana

Binomial name
- Dracaena goldieana Bullen ex Mast. & T.Moore

Synonyms
- Draco goldieana (Bullen ex Mast. & T.Moore) Kuntze 1891; Pleomele goldieana (Bullen ex Mast. & T.Moore) N.E.Br. 1914

= Dracaena goldieana =

Species of plant

Dracaena goldieana is a species of flowering plant in the family Asparagaceae. It is sometimes referred to by the common names Green Zebra, Queen of Dracaenas, or Zebra Striped Dragon Tree. It is a tropical shrub native to Cameroon, the Democratic Republic of the Congo, Equatorial Guinea, Gabon and Nigeria. It is cultivated as an ornamental plant, valued for its richly variegated foliage.

== Description ==
Dracaena goldieana is a small, rhizomatous understory shrub or subshrub growing to 30–60 cm high with a slender stem, up to 1 cm in diameter. The ovate leaves, which measure 18–30 cm long and up to 6.5 cm wide, terminate in a filiform (threadlike) mucro. The leaves are dark green, retained along the entire stem, and are variegated with transverse bands of light grey.

The flowers of D. goldieana are sessile, white in color, and form dense clusters 25-30 mm long.

== Distribution ==
Dracaena goldieana is native to Nigeria and western Central Africa, including Cameroon, Equatorial Guinea, Gabon, and Zaire. It has also been introduced to Trinidad and Tobago.
