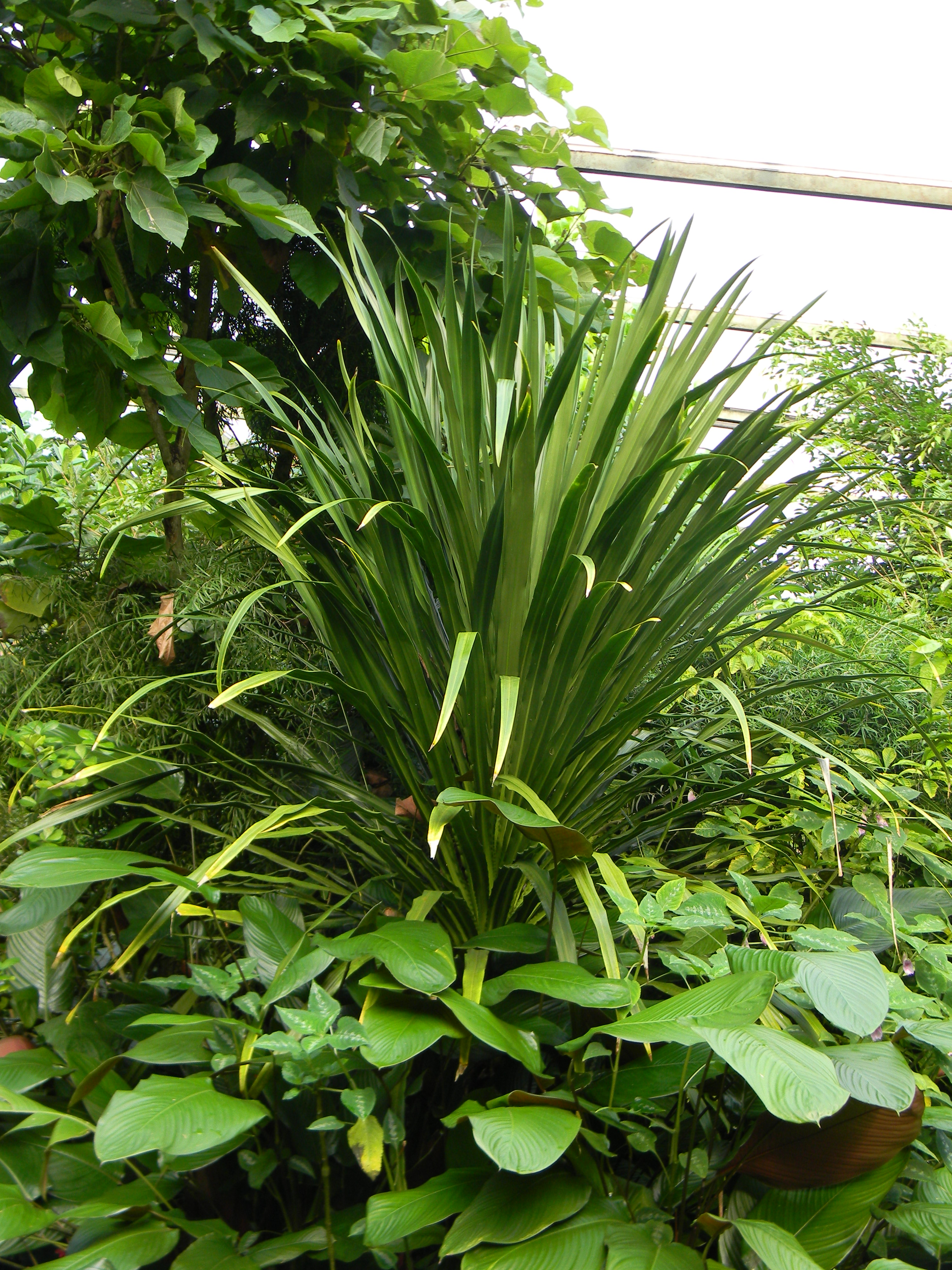
- Dracaena umbraculifera in Burgers Zoo

Scientific classification
- Kingdom: Plantae
- Clade: Tracheophytes
- Clade: Angiosperms
- Clade: Monocots
- Order: Asparagales
- Family: Asparagaceae
- Subfamily: Nolinoideae
- Genus: Dracaena
- Species: D. umbraculifera

Binomial name
- Dracaena umbraculifera Jacq.

= Dracaena umbraculifera =

Species of flowering plant

Dracaena umbraculifera is a species of flowering plant in the family Asparagaceae. It is a tree that was only known from botanical gardens since the end of the 18th century, the original sample was labelled as originating from the island nation of Mauritius. It was declared to be extinct by the IUCN in 1997. This was clearly incorrect, as there are living specimens in botanical gardens around the world. Searches on Mauritius failed to find any trees, however, so it was thought that the IUCN probably should have more correctly assessed the species as 'extinct in the wild'. As such a team of researchers at the Missouri Botanical Garden decided to 'reintroduce' the species back to Mauritius in 2011, clones were propagated by cuttings and planted out in Mauritius in 2012.

Only a year later, however, this also proved to be a mistake. A user called 'Timrann' posting in 2007 on the US website Dave's Garden, a gardening forum, sought to identify a plant in his collection: "Please help me identify this plant [Dracaena umbraculifera]. It grows in N-East of Madagascar in an island called Ste Marie, Illes Aux Nattes". This spurred an effort by a field team to locate the species on Île Sainte-Marie in 2013, and sure enough, it was found in the wild in at least five different surveying localities, ergo, the species was not 'extinct in the wild' after all, and it was now an introduced species on Mauritius.

The team of researchers then published a journal article in 2018 in which the results of their recent microsatellite genotype testing revealed that the species was closer related to species of Dracaena from Madagascar than to species from Mauritius.

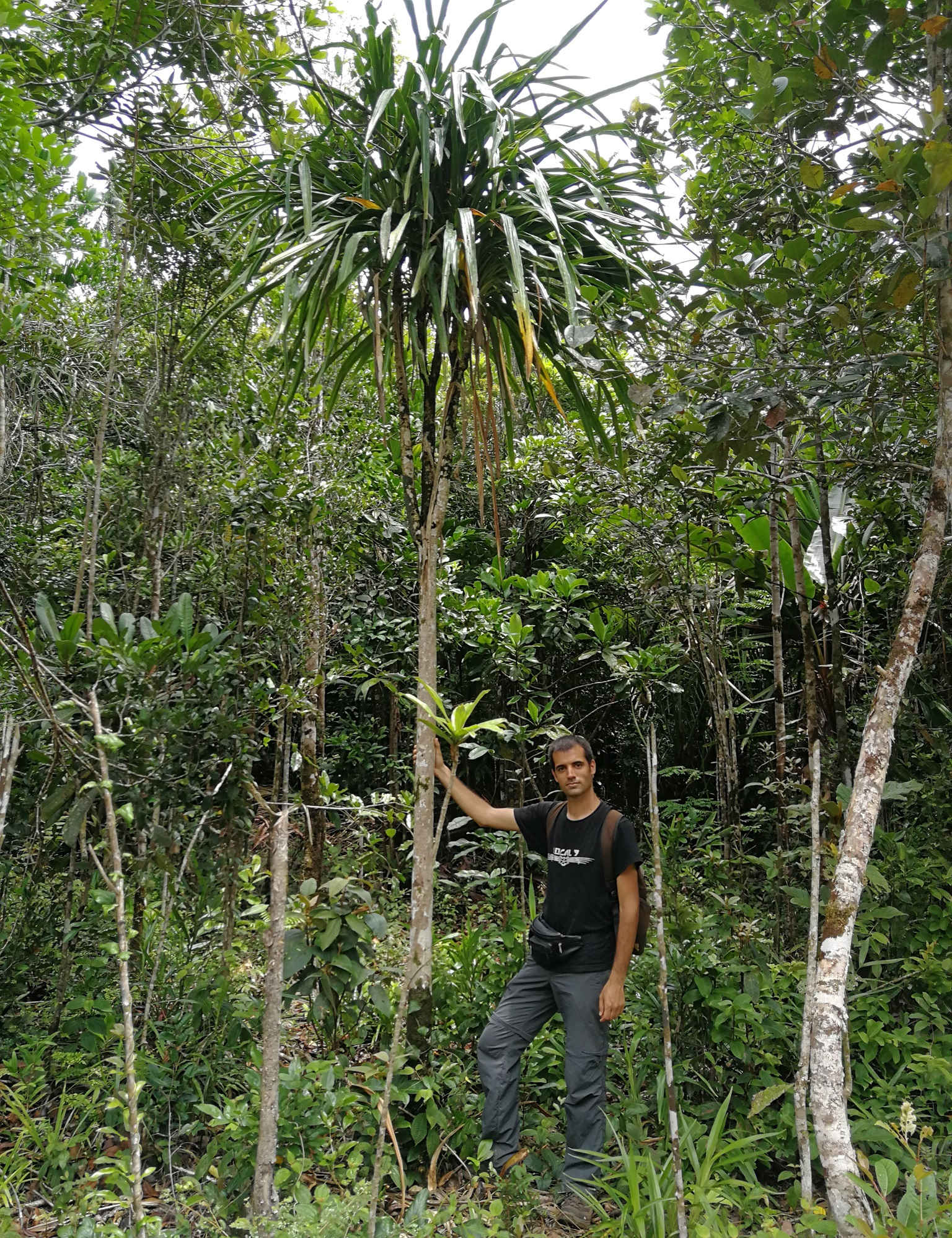
