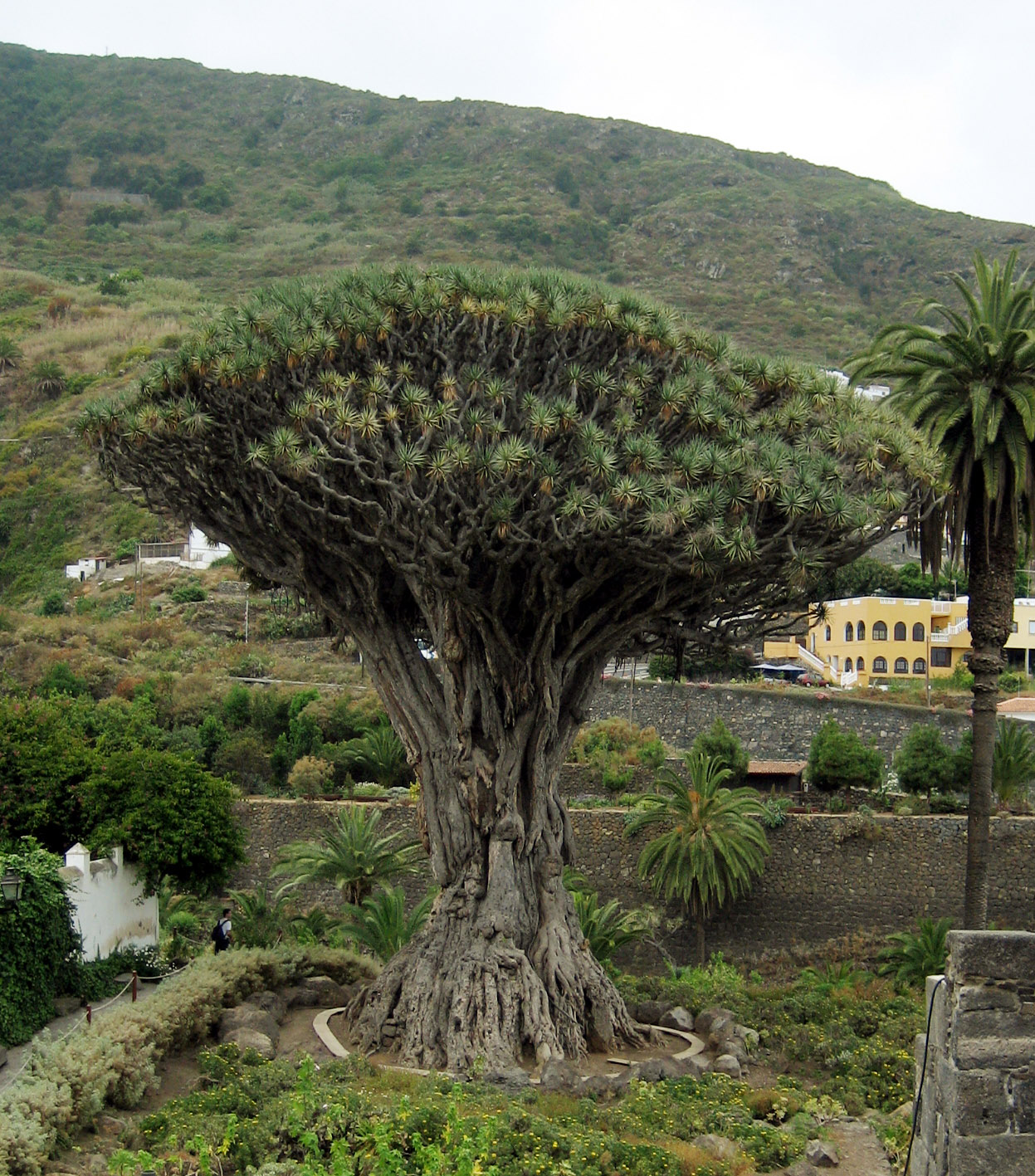
- Dracaena draco in Icod de los Vinos

Scientific classification
- Kingdom: Plantae
- Clade: Embryophytes
- Clade: Tracheophytes
- Clade: Angiosperms
- Clade: Monocots
- Order: Asparagales
- Family: Asparagaceae
- Subfamily: Convallarioideae
- Genus: Dracaena; Vand. ex L.

Diversity
- 200–220 species

Synonyms
- Acyntha Medik.; Chrysodracon P.L.Lu & Morden; Cordyline Adans., nom. rej. (non Cordyline Comm. ex R.Br.); Draco Crantz; Drakaina Raf.; × Dravieria M.H.J.van der Meer; Nemampsis Raf.; Oedera Crantz; Pleomele Salisb.; Salmia Cav.; Sanseverinia Petagna; Sansevieria Thunb.; Stoerkia Crantz; Terminalis Medik.

= Dracaena (plant) =

Dracaena Temporal range: Oligocene-Recent

Genus of flowering plants

Dracaena is a genus of about 200–220 species of trees and woody shrubs. The formerly accepted genera Pleomele and Sansevieria are now included in Dracaena. In the APG IV classification system, it is placed in the family Asparagaceae, subfamily Convallarioideae (formerly the family Ruscaceae). It has also formerly been separated (sometimes with Cordyline) into the family Dracaenaceae or kept in the Agavaceae (now Agavoideae).

The name dracaena is derived from the Latinised form of the Ancient Greek δράκαινα – drakaina, "female dragon".

The Plants of the World Online database accepts 214 species as of September 2025. The majority of the species are native to Africa (including the Canary Islands and Socotra), southern Asia, and northern Australia, but also seven species in Hawai'i, and two in tropical Central America.

== Description ==
Dracaena species can have two growth types: arborescent (tree- or shrub-like) dracaenas (e.g. Dracaena cinnabari, Dracaena draco, Dracaena fragrans), which have stout above-ground stems to around 20 metres tall that branch from nodes after flowering, or if the growth tip is severed; and rhizomatous dracaenas (e.g. Dracaena trifasciata, Dracaena angolensis), which have underground rhizomes and leaves on the surface, ranging from straplike to cylindrical.

The arborescent species of Dracaena have a secondary thickening meristem in their trunks, termed Dracaenoid thickening by some authors, which is quite different from the thickening meristem found in dicotyledonous plants. This characteristic is shared with some members of the Agavoideae, Lomandroideae, and Xanthorrhoeoideae among other members of the Asparagales.

Many species of Dracaena are kept as houseplants due to tolerance of low light and sparse watering.

== Selected species ==
- Dracaena aethiopica (Thunb.) Byng & Christenh.
- Dracaena afromontana Mildbr.
- Dracaena aletriformis (Haw.) Bos (syn. D. latifolia)
- Dracaena americana Donn.Sm. – Central America dragon tree
- Dracaena angolensis (Welw. ex Carrière) Byng & Christenh.
- Dracaena angustifolia (Medik.) Roxb.
- Dracaena arborea (Willd.) Link
- Dracaena arborescens (Cornu ex Gérôme & Labroy) Byng & Christenh.
- Dracaena aubrytiana (Carrière) Byng & Christenh.
- Dracaena aurea H.Mann
- Dracaena bagamoyensis (N.E.Br.) Byng & Christenh.
- Dracaena ballyi (L.E.Newton) Byng & Christenh.
- Dracaena braunii Engl. (syn. D. litoralis)
- Dracaena cinnabari Balf.f. – Socotra dragon tree
- Dracaena cochinchinensis (Lour.) S.C.Chen (syn. D. loureiroi)
- Dracaena draco (L.) L. – Canary Islands dragon tree
- Dracaena eilensis (Chahin.) Byng & Christenh.
- Dracaena ellenbeckiana Engl. - Kedong Dracaena (Ethiopia, Kenya, Uganda)
- Dracaena elliptica Thunb. & Dalm.
- Dracaena fernaldii (H.St.John) Jankalski
- Dracaena forbesii (O.Deg.) Jankalski
- Dracaena fragrans (L.) Ker Gawl. (syn. D. deremensis) – striped dracaena, compact dracaena, corn plant, cornstalk dracaena
- Dracaena ghiesbreghtii W.Bull ex J.J.Blandy
- Dracaena goldieana Bullen ex Mast. & T.Moore
- Dracaena halapepe (H.St.John) Jankalski
- Dracaena hallii (Chahin.) Byng & Christenh.
- Dracaena hanningtonii Baker (syn. D. oldupai)
- Dracaena jayniana Wilkin & Suksathan
- Dracaena kaweesakii Wilkin & Suksathan
- Dracaena konaensis (H.St.John) Jankalski
- Dracaena malawiana Byng & Christenh.
- Dracaena mannii Baker
- Dracaena masoniana (Chahin.) Byng & Christenh.
- Dracaena ombet Heuglin ex Kotschy & Peyr. – Gabal Elba dragon tree
- Dracaena ovata Ker Gawl.
- Dracaena pearsonii (N.E.Br.) Byng & Christenh.
- Dracaena pethera Byng & Christenh.
- Dracaena pinguicula (P.R.O.Bally) Byng & Christenh.
- Dracaena reflexa Lam. – Pleomele dracaena or "Song of India"
  - D. reflexa var. marginata (syn. D. marginata) – red-edged dracaena or Madagascar dragon tree
- Dracaena rockii (H.St.John) Jankalski
- Dracaena sanderiana Engl. – ribbon dracaena, marketed as "lucky bamboo"
- Dracaena serrulata Baker – Yemen dragon tree
- Dracaena singularis (N.E.Br.) Byng & Christenh.
- Dracaena spathulata Byng & Christenh.
- Dracaena steudneri Engl.
- Dracaena stuckyi (God.-Leb.) Byng & Christenh.
- Dracaena suffruticosa (N.E.Br.) Byng & Christenh.
- Dracaena surculosa Lindl. – spotted or gold dust dracaena. Formerly D. godseffiana
- Dracaena tamaranae Marrero Rodr., R.S.Almeira & M.Gonzáles-Martin
- Dracaena transvaalensis Baker
- Dracaena trifasciata (Prain) Mabb.
- Dracaena umbraculifera Jacq.
- Dracaena viridiflora Engl. & K.Krause
- Dracaena zeylanica (L.) Mabb.

=== Formerly regarded as Dracaena ===
- Asparagus asparagoides (L.) Druce (as D. medeoloides L.f.)
- Clintonia borealis Rat. (as D. borealis Ait.)
- Cordyline australis (G.Forst.) Endl. (as D. australis G.Forst.)
- Cordyline fruticosa (L.) A.Chev. (as D. terminalis Lam.)
- Cordyline indivisa (G.Forst.) Steud. (as D. indivisa G.Forst.)
- Cordyline obtecta (Graham) Baker (as D. obtecta Graham)
- Cordyline stricta (Sims) Endl. (as D. stricta Sims)
- Dianella ensifolia (L.) DC. (as D. ensifolia L.)
- Liriope graminifolia (L.) Baker (as D. graminifolia L.)
- Lomandra filiformis (Thunb.) Britten (as D. filiformis Thunb.)

== Uses ==
=== Ornamental ===
Some shrubby species, such as D. fragrans, D. surculosa, D. marginata, and D. sanderiana, are popular as houseplants. Many of these are toxic to pets, though not humans, according to the ASPCA among others. Rooted stem cuttings of D. sanderiana are sold as "lucky bamboo", although only superficially resembling true bamboos.

Dracaena houseplants like humidity and moderate watering. They can tolerate periods of drought but the tips of the leaves may turn brown. Leaves at the base will naturally yellow and drop off, leaving growth at the top and a bare stem. Dracaena are vulnerable to mealybugs and scale insects.

=== Other ===
A naturally occurring bright red resin, dragon's blood, is collected from D. draco and, in ancient times, from D. cinnabari. Modern dragon's blood is, however, more likely to be from the unrelated Calamus rattan palms, formerly placed in Daemonorops. (Note: Fruit as source of red resin exuded between scales, used medicinally and as a dye (one source of "dragon's blood"): Daemonorops didymophylla; Daemonorops draco; Daemonorops maculata; Daemonorops micrantha; Daemonorops propinqua; Daemonorops rubra) It also has social functions in marking graves, sacred sites, and farm plots in many African societies.

== Gallery ==
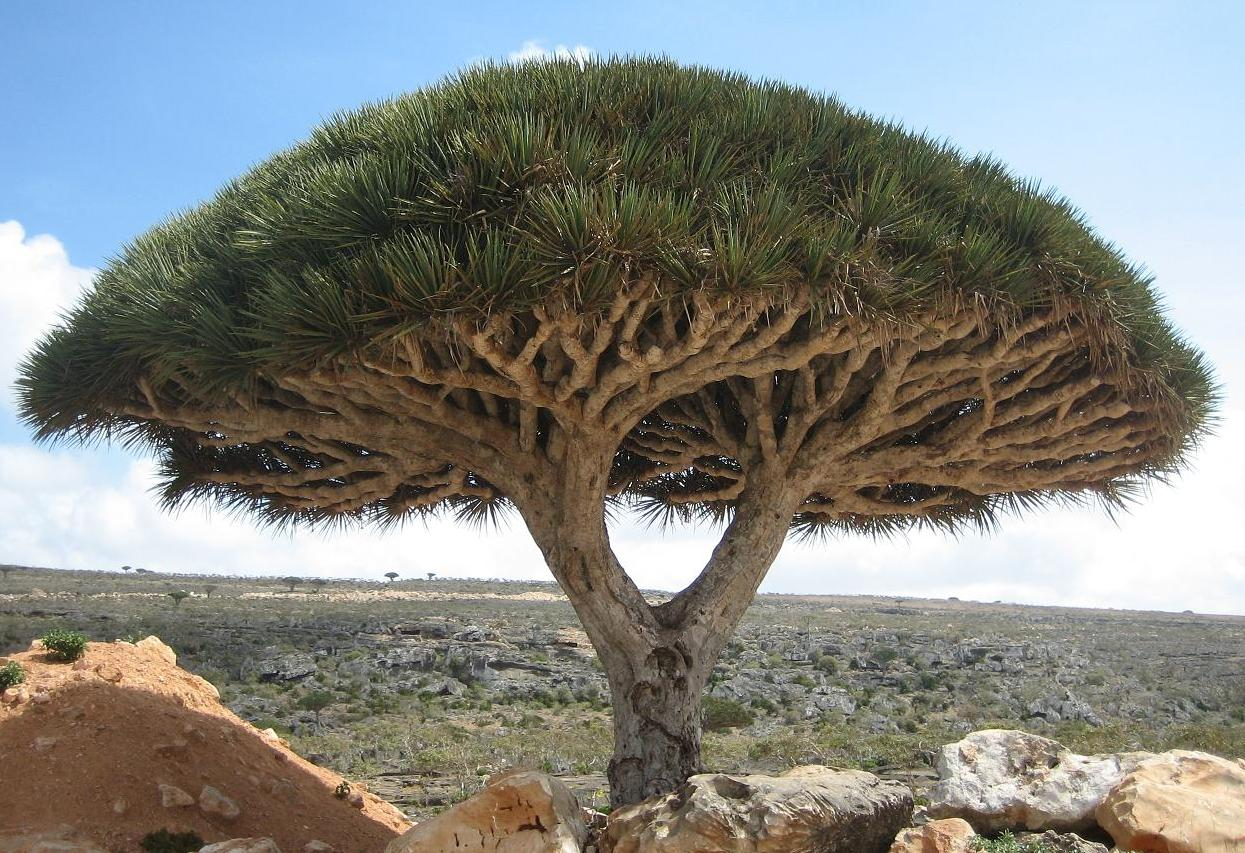
Dracaena cinnabari

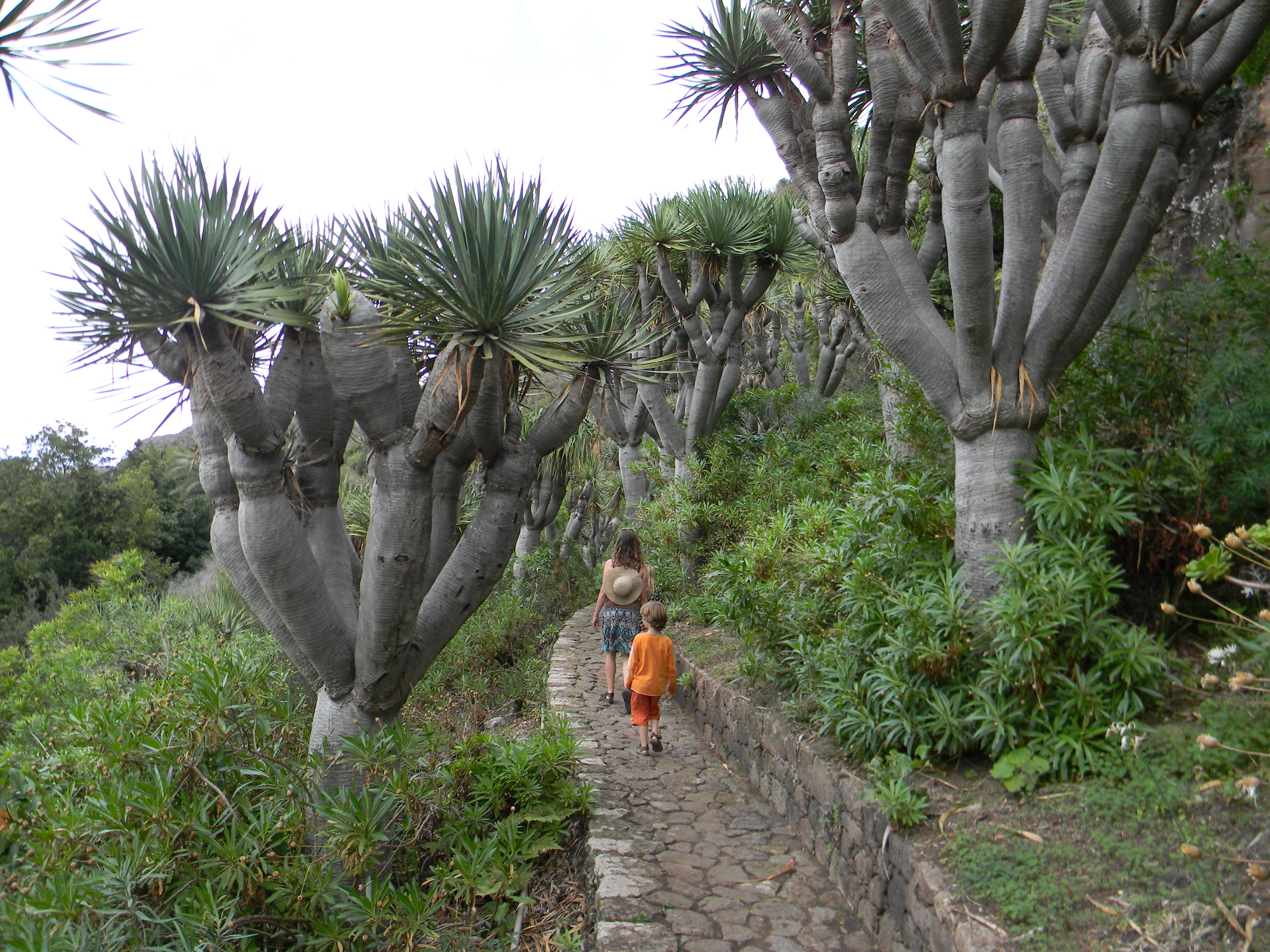
Dracaena draco

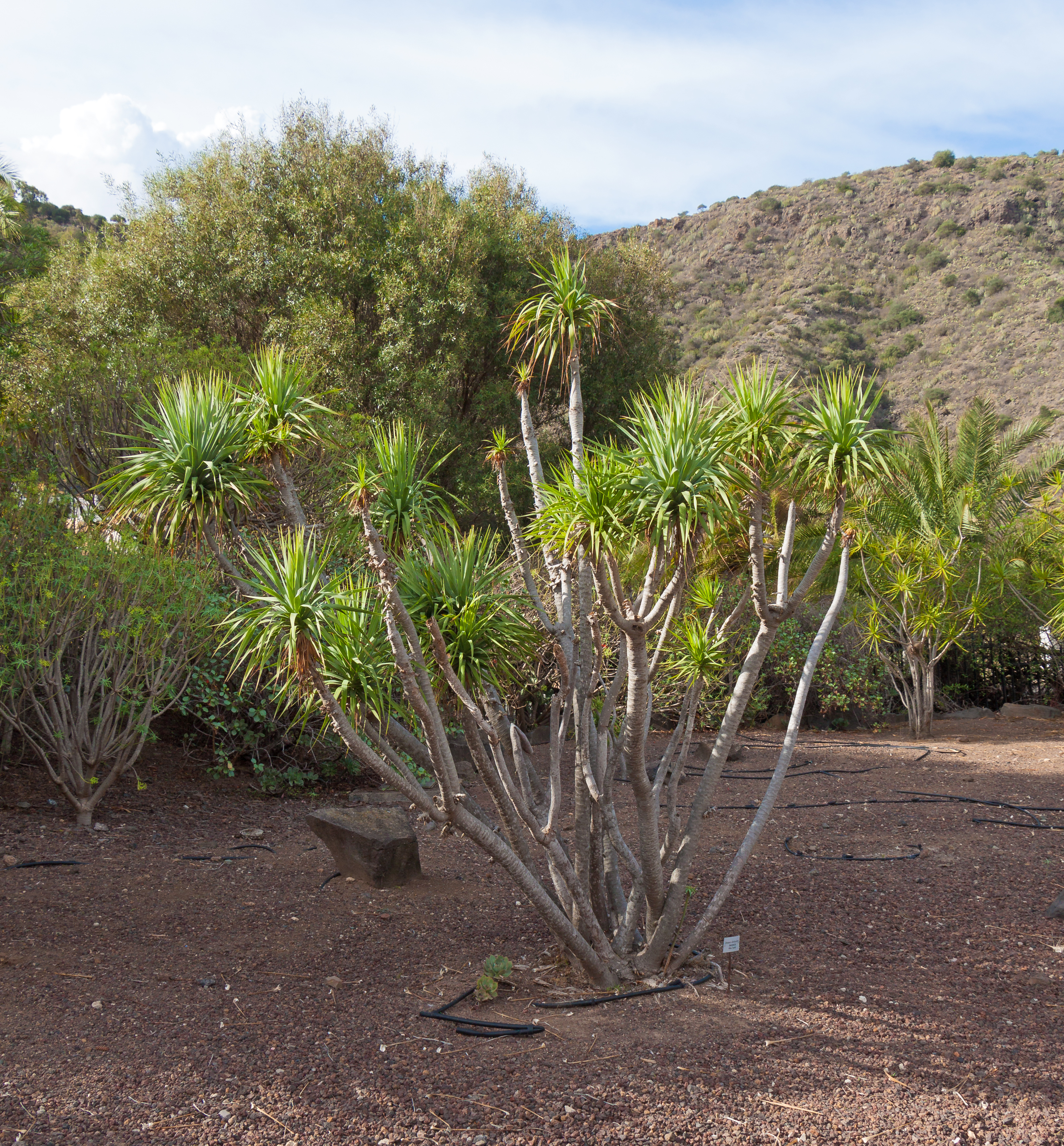
Dracaena ellenbeckiana

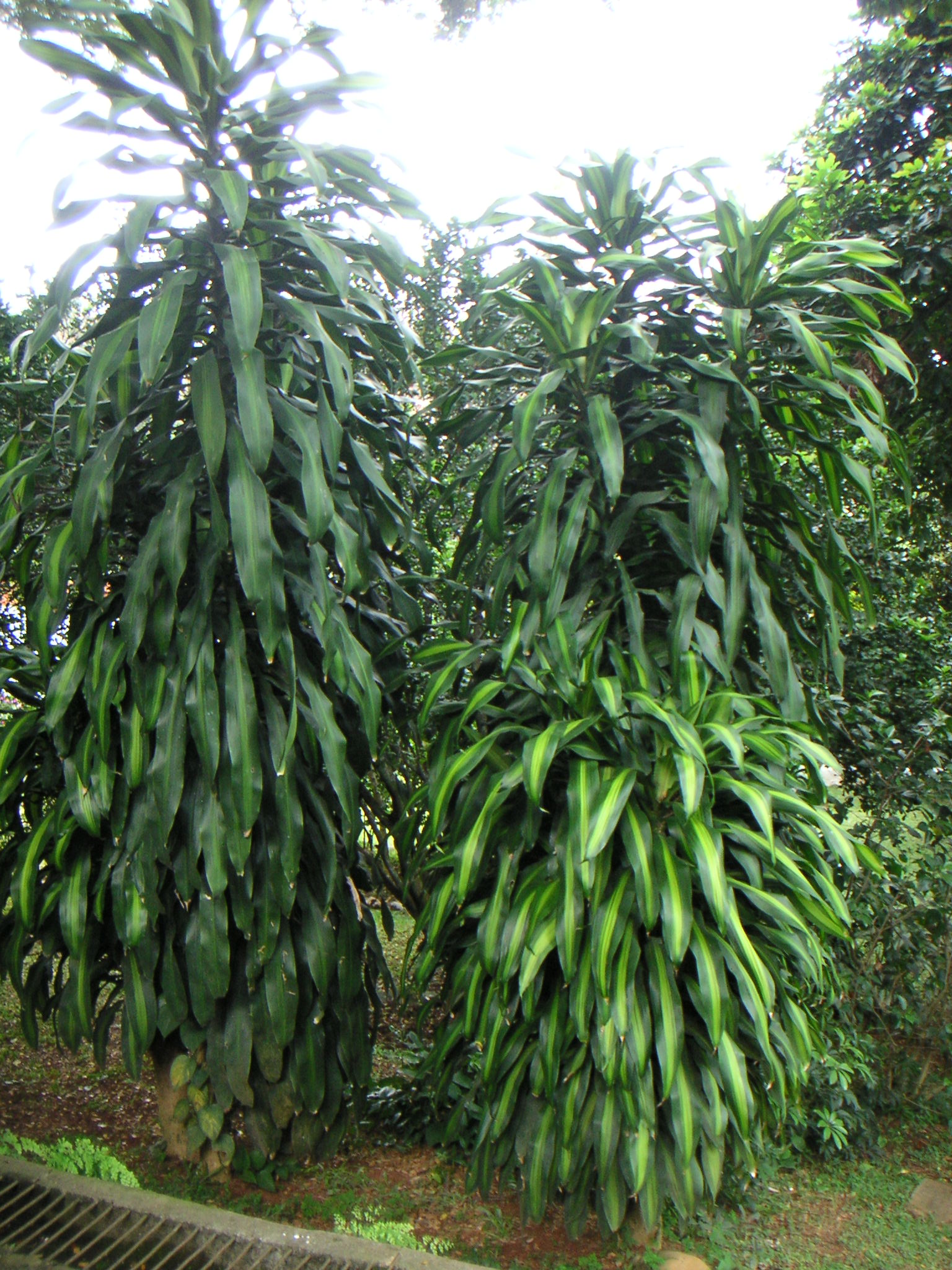
Dracaena fragrans

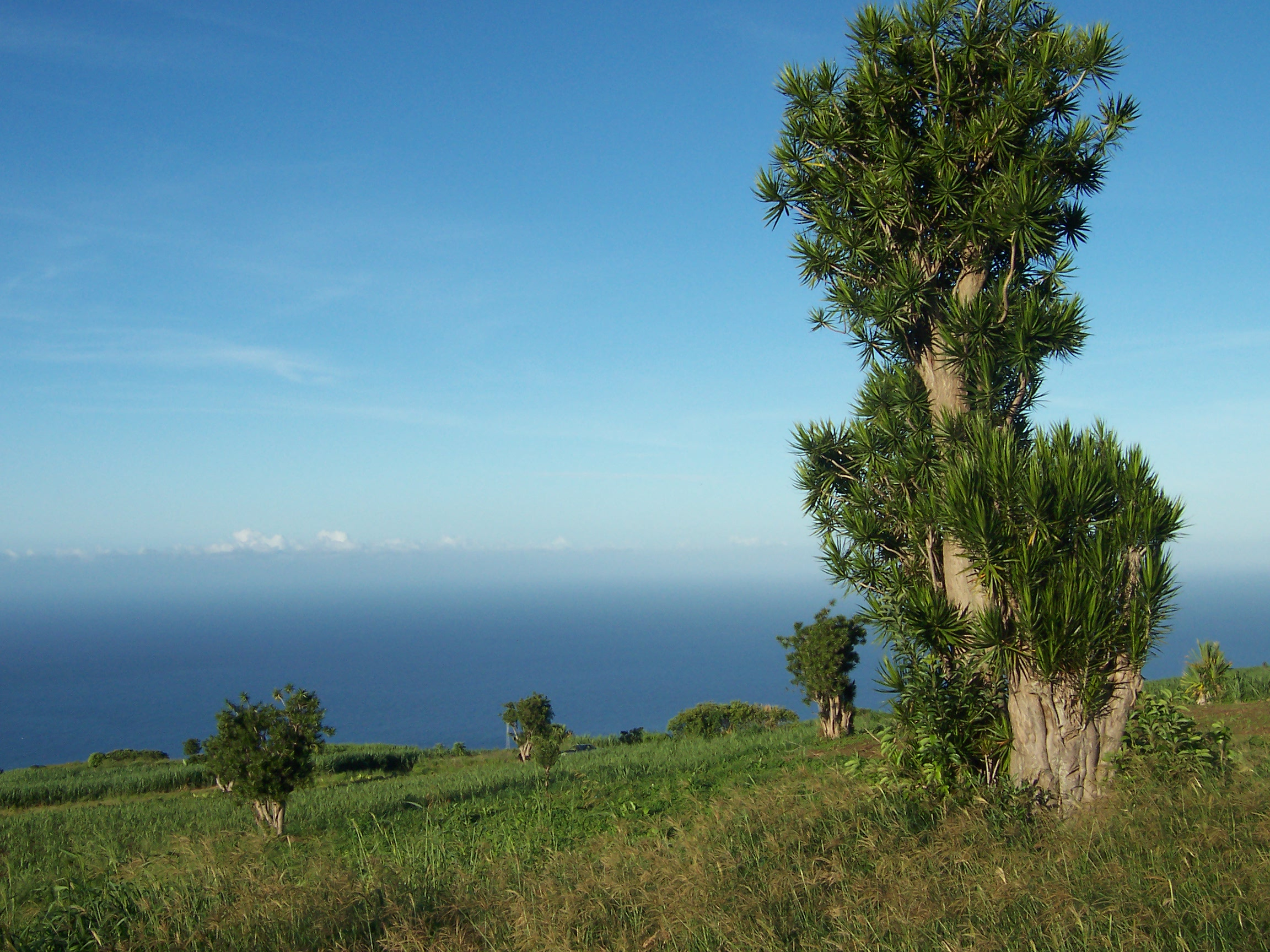
Dracaena reflexa

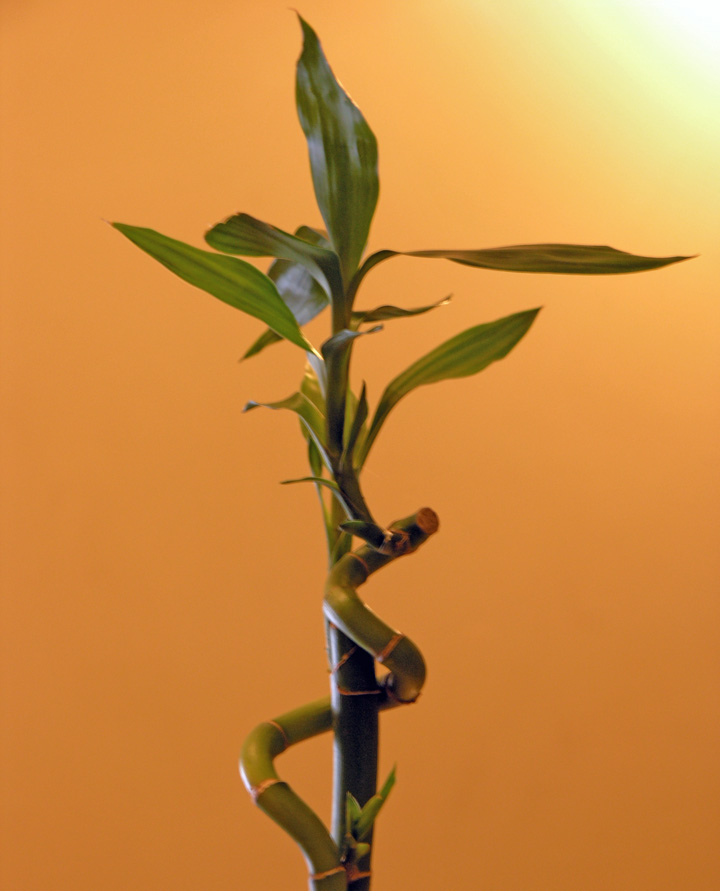
Dracaena sanderiana

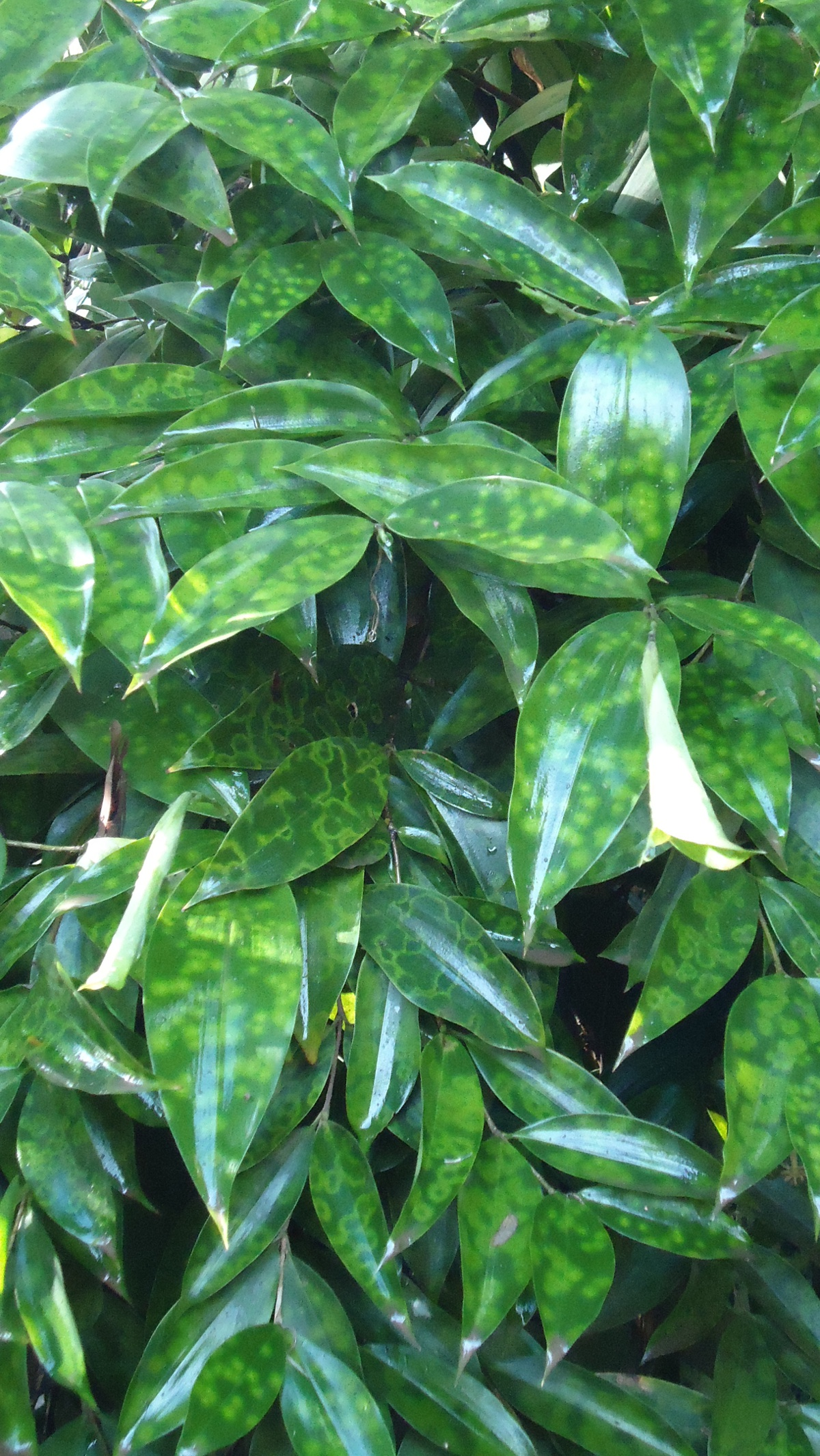
Dracaena surculosa

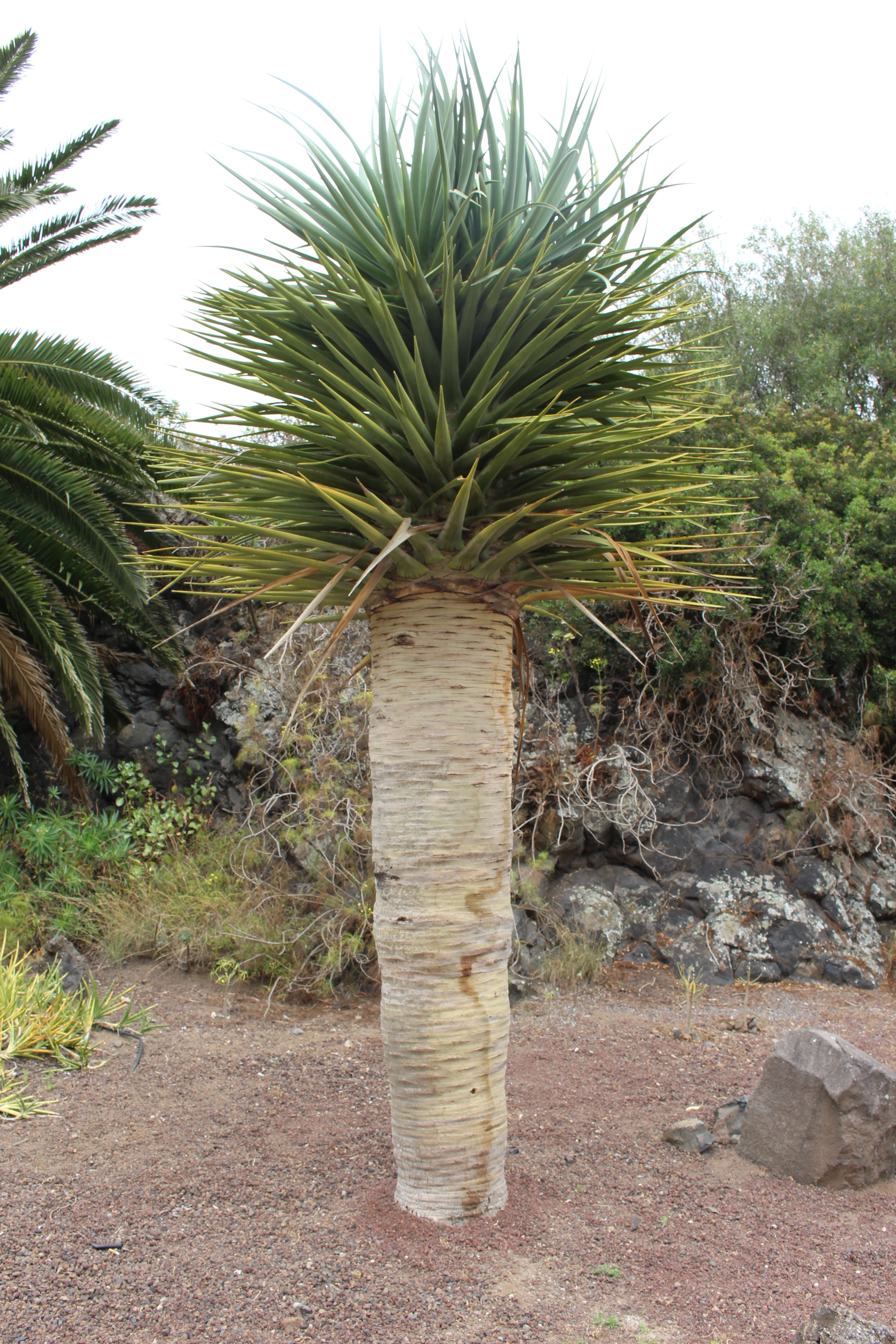
Dracaena tamaranae - native to Gran Canaria

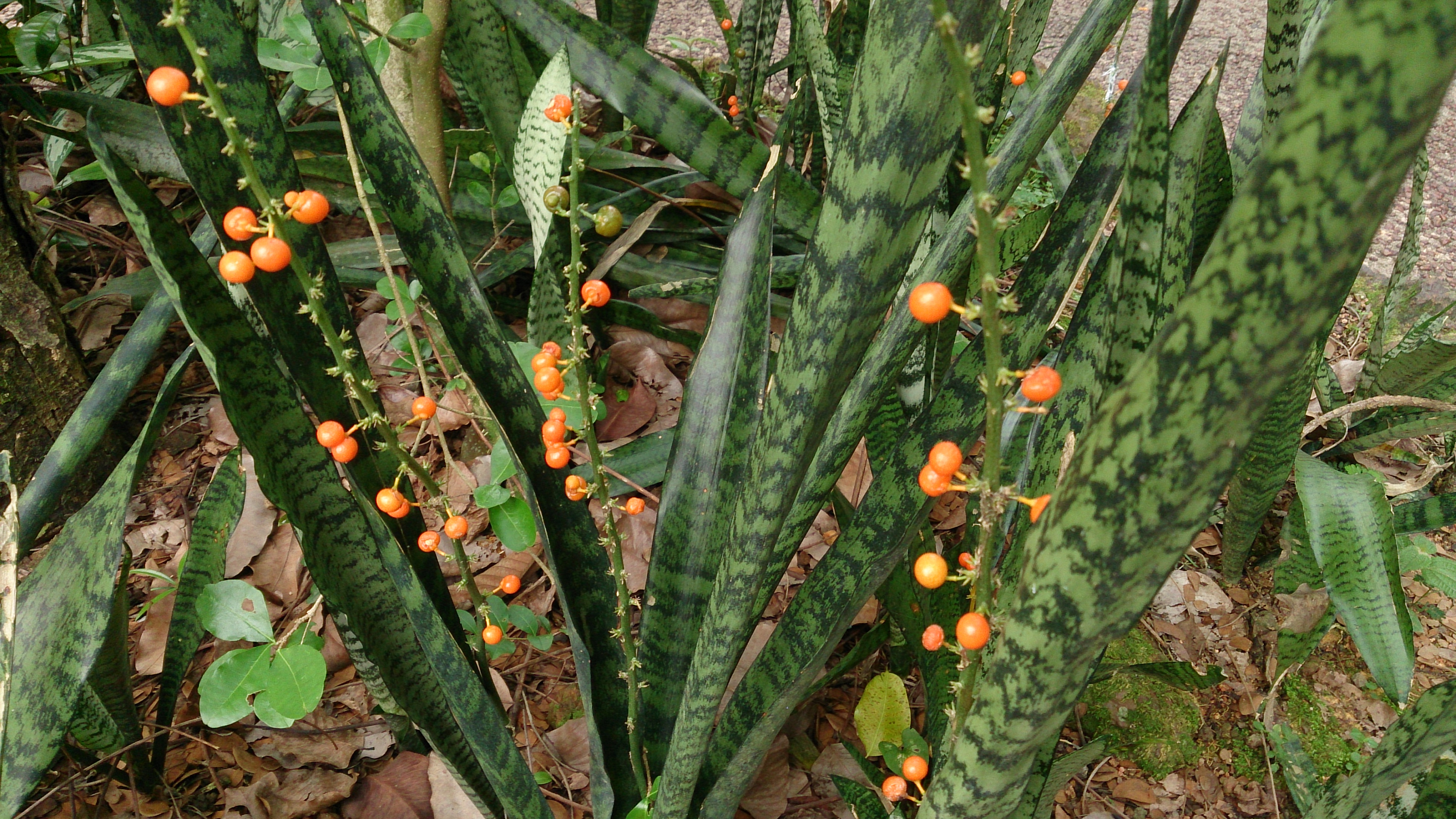
Dracaena trifasciata
