= Dracaena aubrytiana =

Scientific classification
- Kingdom: Plantae
- Clade: Tracheophytes
- Clade: Angiosperms
- Clade: Monocots
- Order: Asparagales
- Family: Asparagaceae
- Subfamily: Nolinoideae
- Genus: Dracaena
- Species: D. aubrytiana

Binomial name
- Dracaena aubrytiana (Carrière) Byng & Christenh.

Synonyms
- Sansevieria aubrytiana Carrière; Acyntha bracteata (Baker) Kuntze; Sansevieria bracteata Baker

Species of flowering plant

Dracaena aubrytiana, synonym Sansevieria aubrytiana, is a succulent plant native to tropical Africa. Its leaves are distichous (arranged in two vertical rows), each leaf being up to 90 cm (35 in) long; the blade, or lamina being up to 50 cm (20 in) and the stalk or petiole being up to 40 cm (16 in). The leaves resemble those of Curculigo or palm seedlings. The unbranched trunk brings the total height to 2.5 m (8 ft 2 in).
