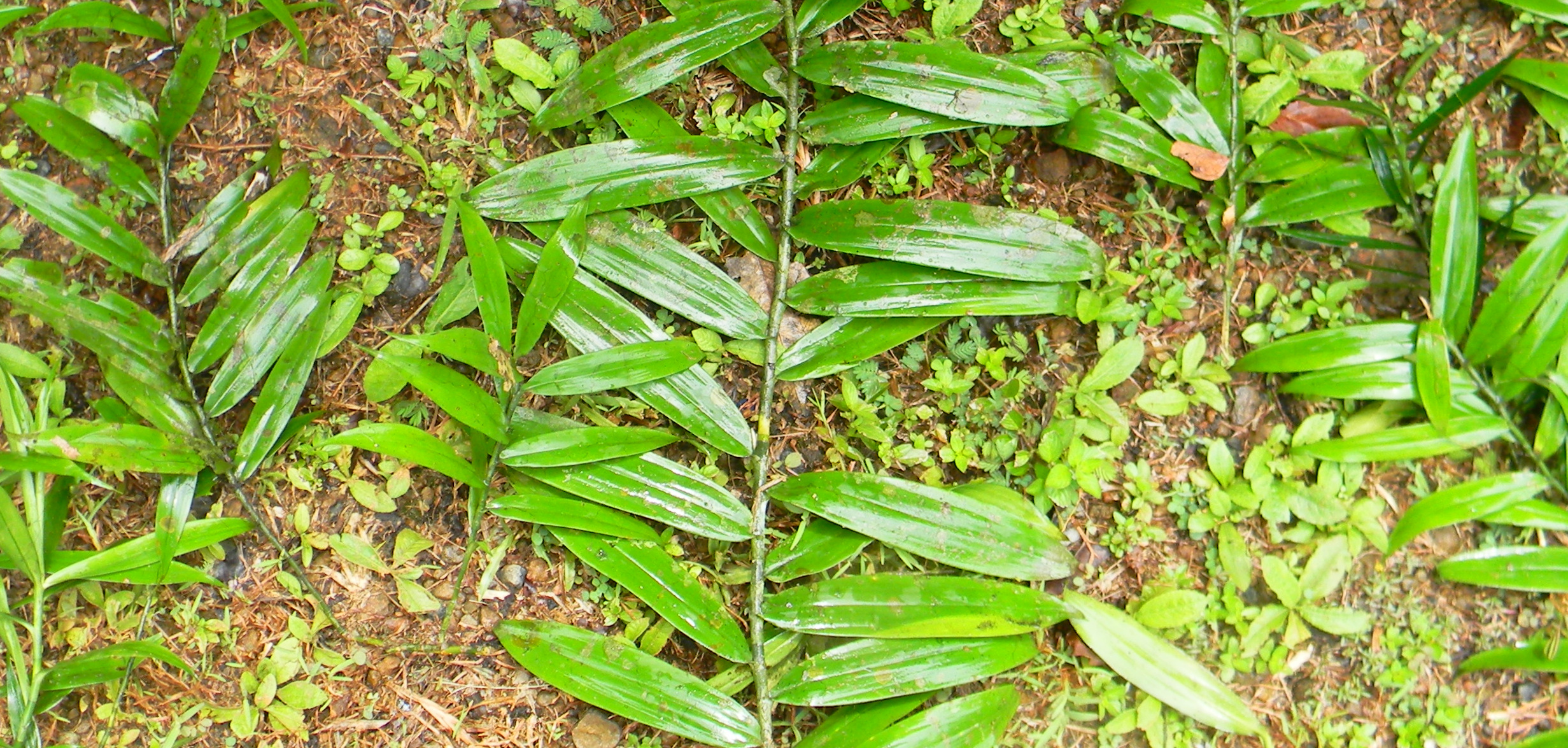

Conservation status
- Vulnerable (IUCN 3.1)

Scientific classification
- Kingdom: Plantae
- Clade: Tracheophytes
- Clade: Angiosperms
- Clade: Monocots
- Order: Asparagales
- Family: Asparagaceae
- Subfamily: Convallarioideae
- Genus: Dracaena
- Species: D. viridiflora

Binomial name
- Dracaena viridiflora Engl. & K.Krause

Synonyms
- Pleomele viridiflora (Engl. & K.Krause) N.E.Br.; Dracaena ledermannii Engl. & K.Krause; Dracaena letestui Pellegr.; Dracaena mildbraedii K.Krause; Dracaena vaginata Hutch.

= Dracaena viridiflora =

Species of plant

Dracaena viridiflora is a species of shrub or small plant belonging to the family Asparagaceae.

== Description ==
The species grows up to 5 m high. Its leaves are evenly distributed along the branches. They tend to be oblong to lanceolate in outline and up to 25 cm long and 2 cm wide. The surfaces of the leaves are dark green and shiny above but paler beneath; the apex is acute while sheathing commonly occurs at the base of the leaves. The inflorescence is usually terminal but less commonly axillary and up to 9 cm long with flowers arranged in sessile clusters.

== Distribution ==
The species occurs in parts of West Africa in Ghana and Nigeria then eastwards towards Cameroon and Angola.

== Uses ==
Traditionally, leaf extracts of the plant are used in the treatment of microbial infections and epilepsy.
