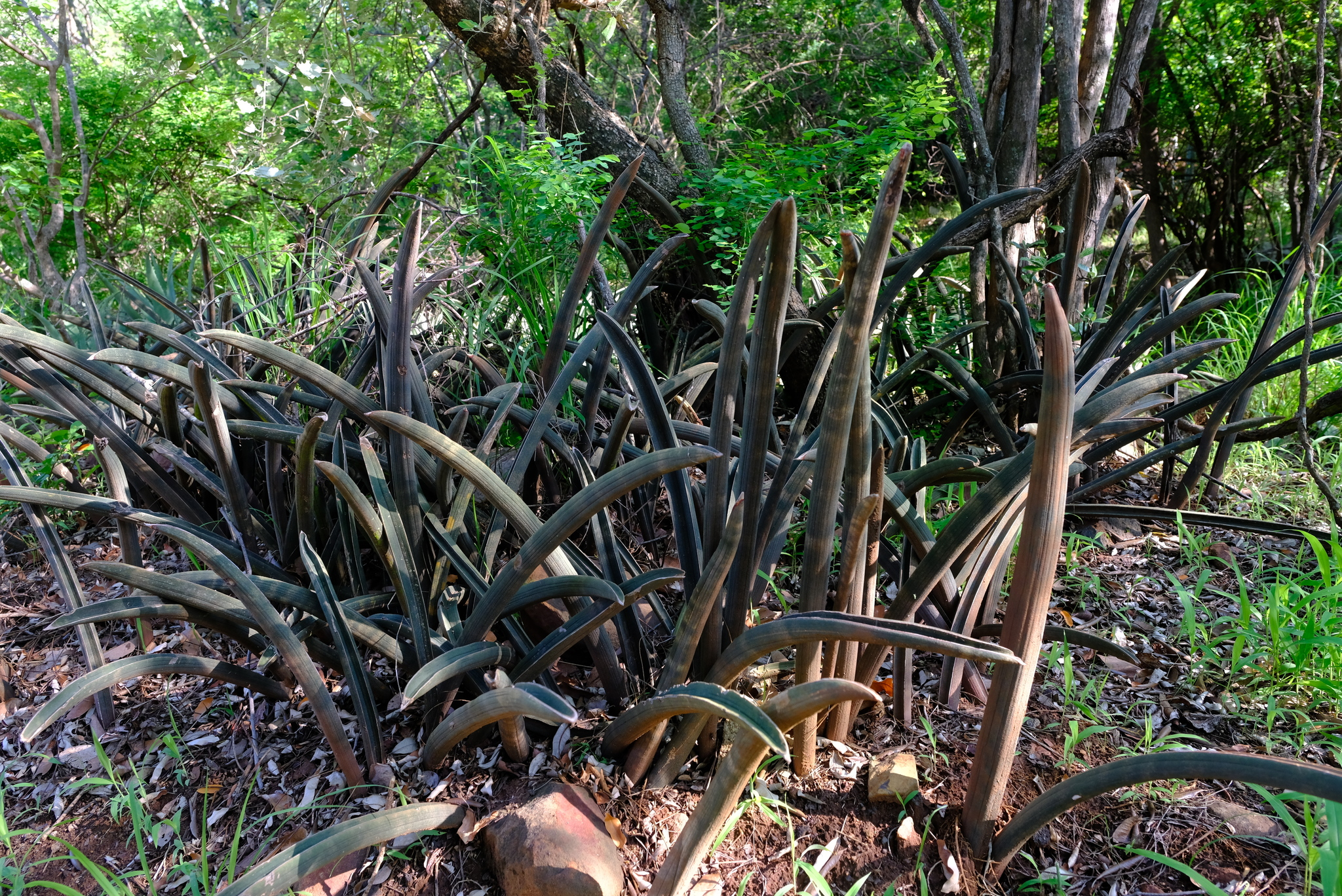
- D. hallii growing in habitat in South Africa

Scientific classification
- Kingdom: Plantae
- Clade: Tracheophytes
- Clade: Angiosperms
- Clade: Monocots
- Order: Asparagales
- Family: Asparagaceae
- Subfamily: Nolinoideae
- Genus: Dracaena
- Species: D. hallii

Binomial name
- Dracaena hallii Chahin.

Synonyms
- Sansevieria hallii

= Dracaena hallii =

Species of plant

Dracaena hallii is a species of succulent plant native to Mozambique, Zimbabwe, and Limpopo Province of South Africa. The species was named for Harry Hall, formerly the curator of succulents at Kirstenbosch National Botanical Garden in Cape Town. Commonly known as the "baseball bat" plant, it has extremely thick foliage with a rounded shape and a central channel.
