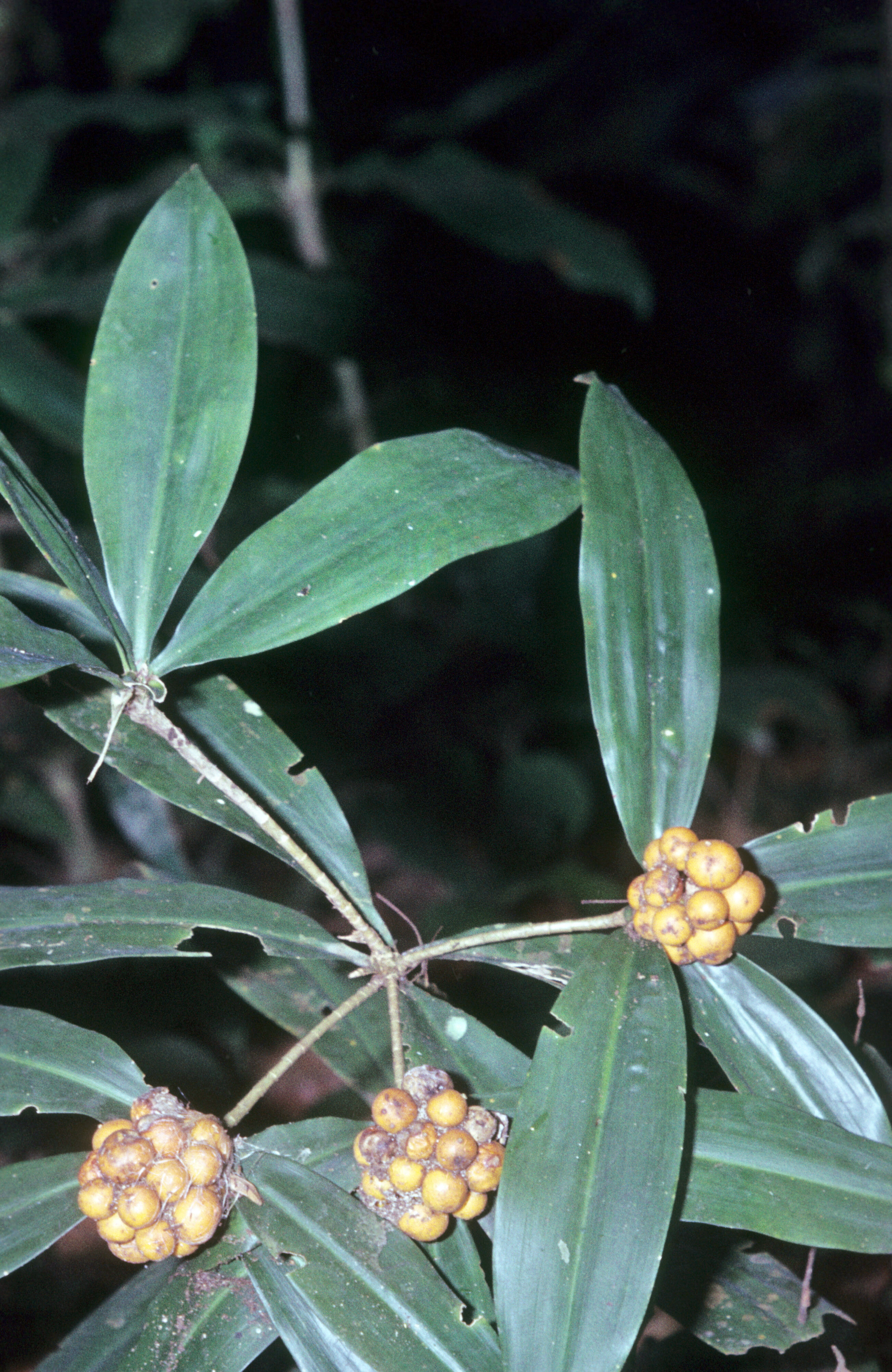

Scientific classification
- Kingdom: Plantae
- Clade: Embryophytes
- Clade: Tracheophytes
- Clade: Spermatophytes
- Clade: Angiosperms
- Clade: Monocots
- Order: Asparagales
- Family: Asparagaceae
- Subfamily: Convallarioideae
- Genus: Dracaena
- Species: D. ovata

Binomial name
- Dracaena ovata Ker Gawl.

Synonyms
- Cordyline ovata (Ker Gawl.) Planch.; Draco ovata (Ker Gawl.) Kuntze; Dracaena afzelii Baker; Dracaena prolata C.H.Wright; Dracaena sessiliflora C.H.Wright; Draco afzelii (Baker) Kuntze; Pleomele afzelii (Baker) N.E.Br.; Pleomele prolata (C.H.Wright) N.E.Br.; Aletris pumila Donn

= Dracaena ovata =

Species of shrub

Dracaena ovata is a shrub or small tree within the family Asparagaceae.

== Description ==
The species grows up to 2 metres (6.6 ft) tall. The stem is commonly yellowish brown in color and is fibrous when young with prophylls often present. Its leaves are arranged in whorls, petiole is present and up to 4 millimetres (0.16 in); leaves are ovate to obovate in outline, can reach up to 28 centimetres (11 in) long and 8 centimetres (3 in) wide, base is cuneate while apex is acuminate. Inflorescence is terminal racemes, up to 6 centimetres (2.4 in) long with white flowers. The fruit is globular in shape, and up to 25 millimetres (1 in) in diameter, green when young and yellow and orange when ripe.

== Distribution ==
The species occurs in West Africa, from Sierra Leone westwards to Southern Cameroon.
