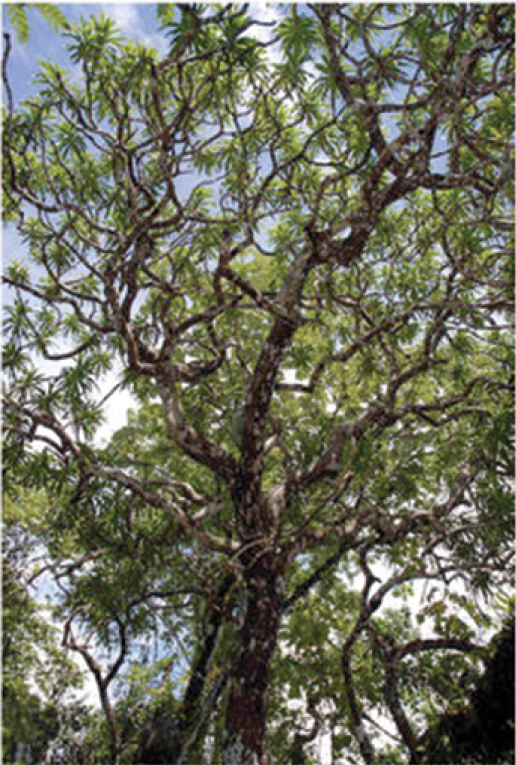
- Dracaena kaweesakii viewed from below

Scientific classification
- Kingdom: Plantae
- Clade: Embryophytes
- Clade: Tracheophytes
- Clade: Angiosperms
- Clade: Monocots
- Order: Asparagales
- Family: Asparagaceae
- Subfamily: Convallarioideae
- Genus: Dracaena
- Species: D. kaweesakii

Binomial name
- Dracaena kaweesakii Wilkin & Suksathan, 2013

= Dracaena kaweesakii =

Species of flowering plant

Dracaena kaweesakii (Kaweesak's dragon tree; Thai: Chan nuu or Chan pha krai) is a species of dragon tree. It can reach 12 metres (39 ft) in both height and crown diameter. It is only found growing atop the limestone mountains in the Loei and the Lop Buri Provinces of Thailand.

== Description ==
Dracaena kaweesakii is a species of dragon tree characterized by an extensive branching system; a fully grown specimen has several hundred branches. It has sword shaped leaves with white edges that grow in large clusters (20-50 leaves) and can be up to 60 centimetres (24 in) long. It has cream-colored flowers that have and slight green or yellow tint and bright orange filaments. D. kaweesakii produces brown fruit that turn orange when ripe. Seeds are 6 to 7 centimetres (2.4 to 2.8 in) in diameter. D. kaweesakii can grow to be 12 metres (39 ft) tall with a crown diameter of 12 metres (39 ft). The tree's trunk can reach 1 metre (3.3 ft) in diameter.

Dracaena kaweesakii in known from northern, northeastern, and central Thailand. Oral reports suggest it is also found in neighboring Burma. The tree grows on limestone outcrops at altitudes of 550 to 2,000 metres (1,800 to 6,560 ft). Higher altitude specimens tend to be shorter and less branching and smaller leaves. Because of its limited distribution and the harvesting of limestone for concrete production the species is thought to be endangered. As of 2013, the population was estimated to be less than 2500.

In May 2014, the International Institute for Species Exploration named D. kaweesakii as one of the "Top 10 New Species" named in 2013.

== Taxonomic history ==
Dracaena kaweesakii was first described in 2013 by Paul Wilkin et al. in the journal PhytoKeys. The specific name derives from the name of Kaweesak Keeratikiat, a member of the team that identified the tree as a unique species.

== Use by humans ==
Dracaena kaweesakii is commonly used in Thai horticulture due to its extensive branching. A number of specimens are found on the grounds of Buddhist temples. In general, species of Dracaena are thought to bring good luck to those who have the trees in their yards.
