= Dracaena jayniana =

Scientific classification
- Kingdom: Plantae
- Clade: Tracheophytes
- Clade: Angiosperms
- Clade: Monocots
- Order: Asparagales
- Family: Asparagaceae
- Subfamily: Nolinoideae
- Genus: Dracaena
- Species: D. jayniana

Binomial name
- Dracaena jayniana Wilkin [wd] & Suksathan [wd]

Species of plant

Dracaena jayniana is a species of plant in the genus Dracaena. It was described by Paul Wilkin and Piyakaset Suksathan in 2012. It is known as Chan daeng in Thai. The specific epithet is named for Jayne Spasojevic, a donor to a school in Portfield, Dorset.

== Distribution ==
The species is found on hilltop limestone karsts from central to northeastern Thailand, 300–500 meters in elevation.

== Description ==
Dracaena jayniana is a woody, branching tree up to 8 meters in height tall. The bark is brown and oozes a red sap. Leaves are pale green and leathery. Flowers are golden yellow, and the fruit is a red berry.
