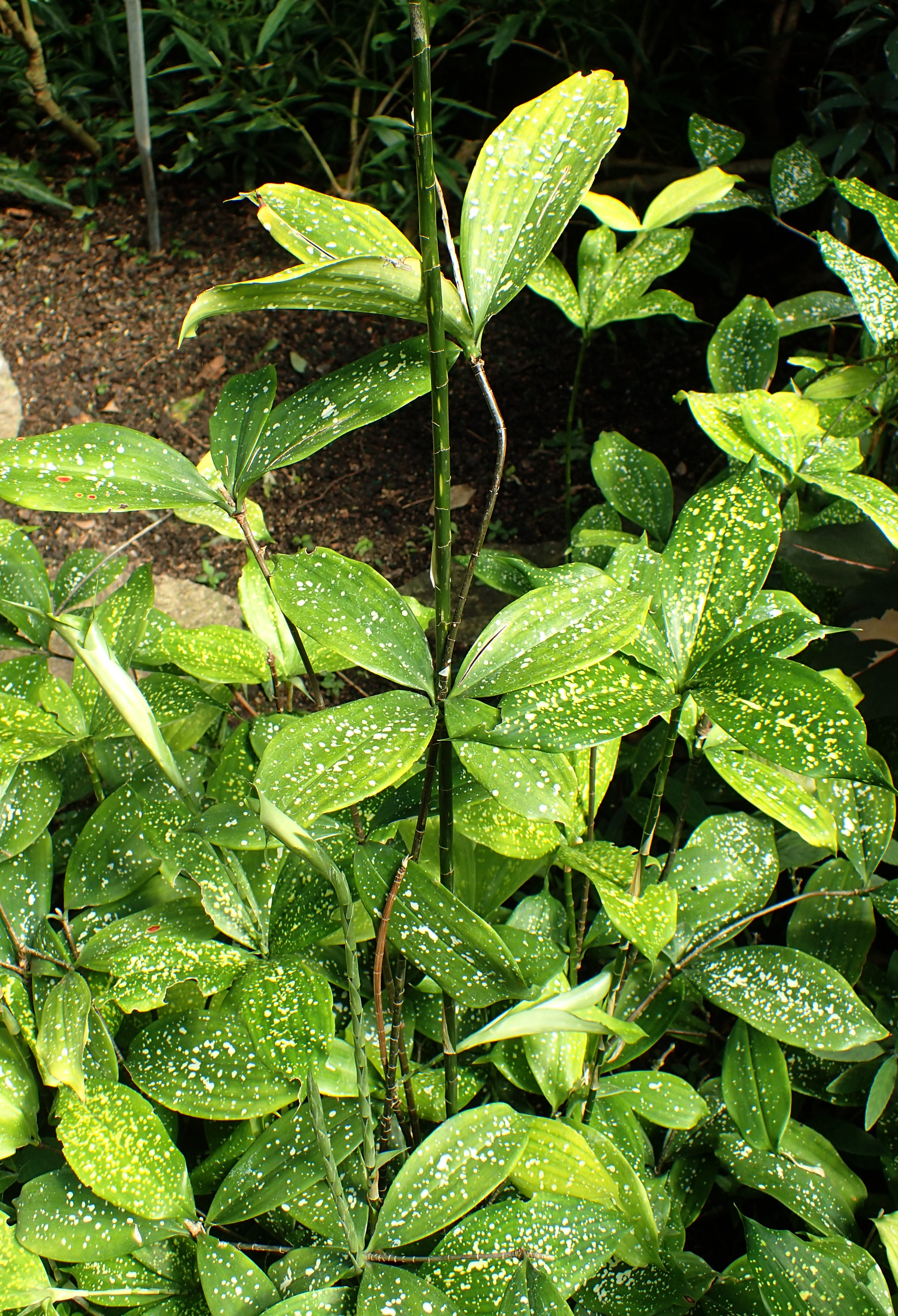
- Habit
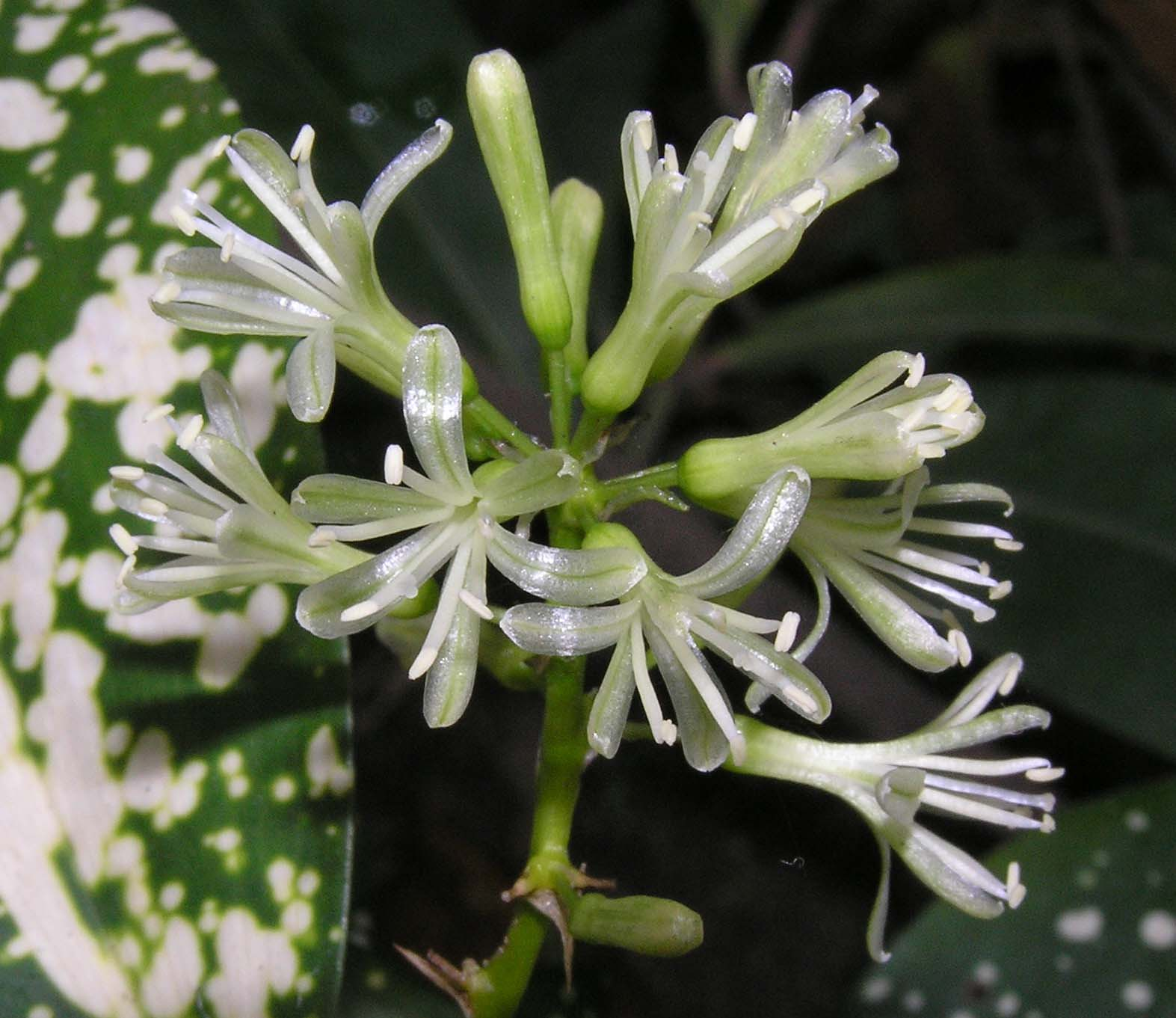
- Close-up of flower

Scientific classification
- Kingdom: Plantae
- Clade: Tracheophytes
- Clade: Angiosperms
- Clade: Monocots
- Order: Asparagales
- Family: Asparagaceae
- Subfamily: Nolinoideae
- Genus: Dracaena
- Species: D. surculosa

Binomial name
- Dracaena surculosa Lindl.

Synonyms
- Dracaena godseffiana Sander ex Mast.; Dracaena interrupta Harv. ex G.Don; Nemampsis ternifolia Raf.; Pleomele godseffiana (Sander ex Mast.) N.E.Br.

= Dracaena surculosa =

Species of flowering plant

Dracaena surculosa, called the gold dust dracaena and spotted dracaena, is a species of flowering plant in the family Asparagaceae, native to west and west-central tropical Africa, from Guinea to the Republic of the Congo. Its cultivar 'Florida Beauty' has gained the Royal Horticultural Society's Award of Garden Merit.

== Subtaxa ==
The following varieties are accepted:

- Dracaena surculosa var. maculata Hook.f.
- Dracaena surculosa var. surculosa

== Description ==
A branched shrub or small tree that commonly grows less than 4 m in height but occasionally reaches 8 m, it has reddish brown tuberous roots that sometimes produce canelike shoots that are sometimes clad in thin greenish to white phrophylls. Leaves are concolorous or variegated, glossy bright to dark green above and sometimes infused with white to yellowish dots; they are arranged in pseudowhorls with margins that are sometimes rough or smooth, apex is acuminate and base is cunneate. Leaflets can reach up to 20 cm long and 7 cm wide and are elliptic in outline. Flowers are greenish to white. Fruits is orange to bright red in colour, globose and up to 2 cm in diameter.

== Distribution and habitat ==
Occurs naturally in West Africa from Guinea westwards to Cameroon.

== Uses ==
Commonly cultivated in botanical gardens and used as an ornamental plant.

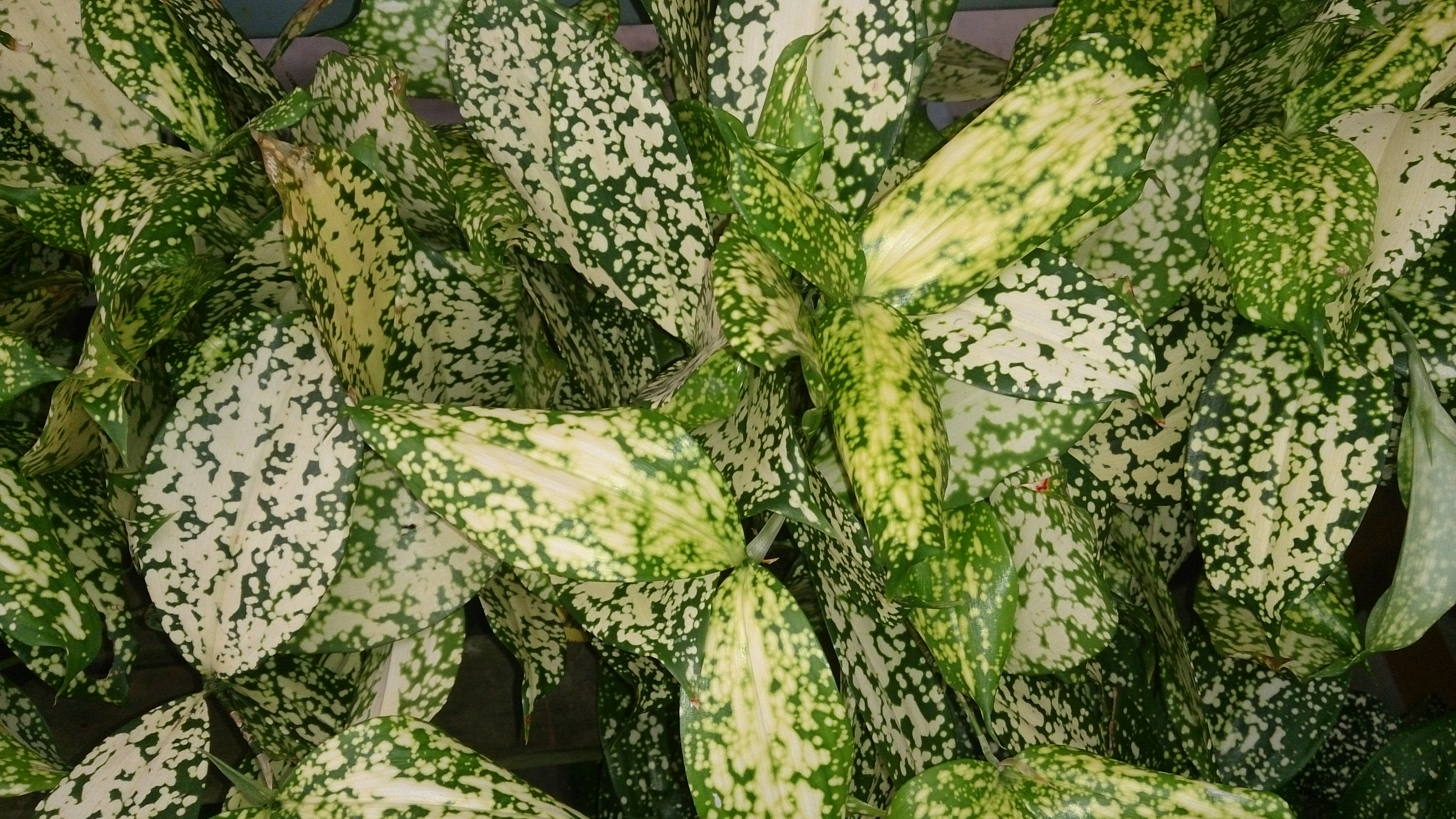
Dracaena surculosa 'Florida Beauty'

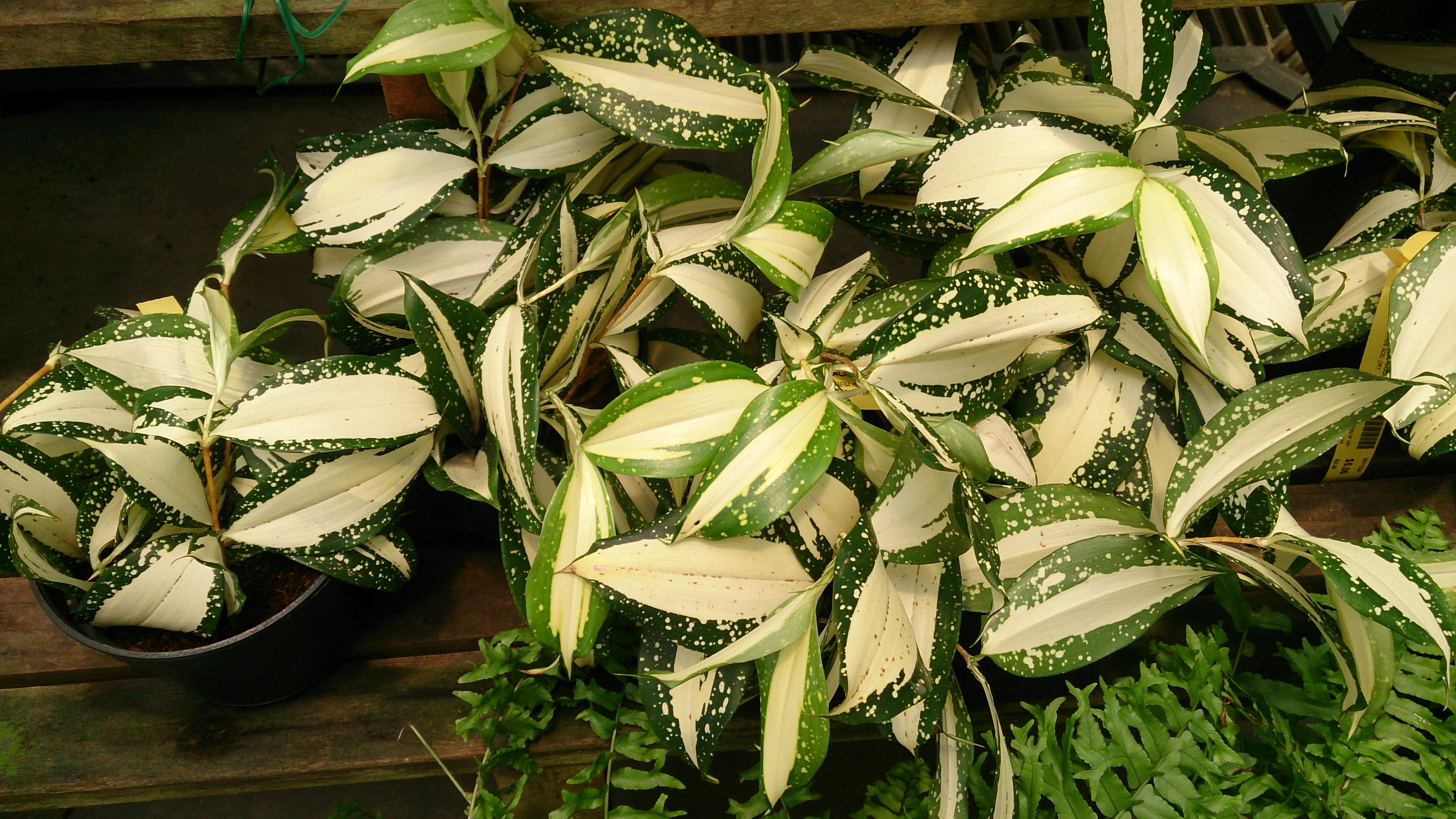
Dracaena surculosa 'Milky Way'

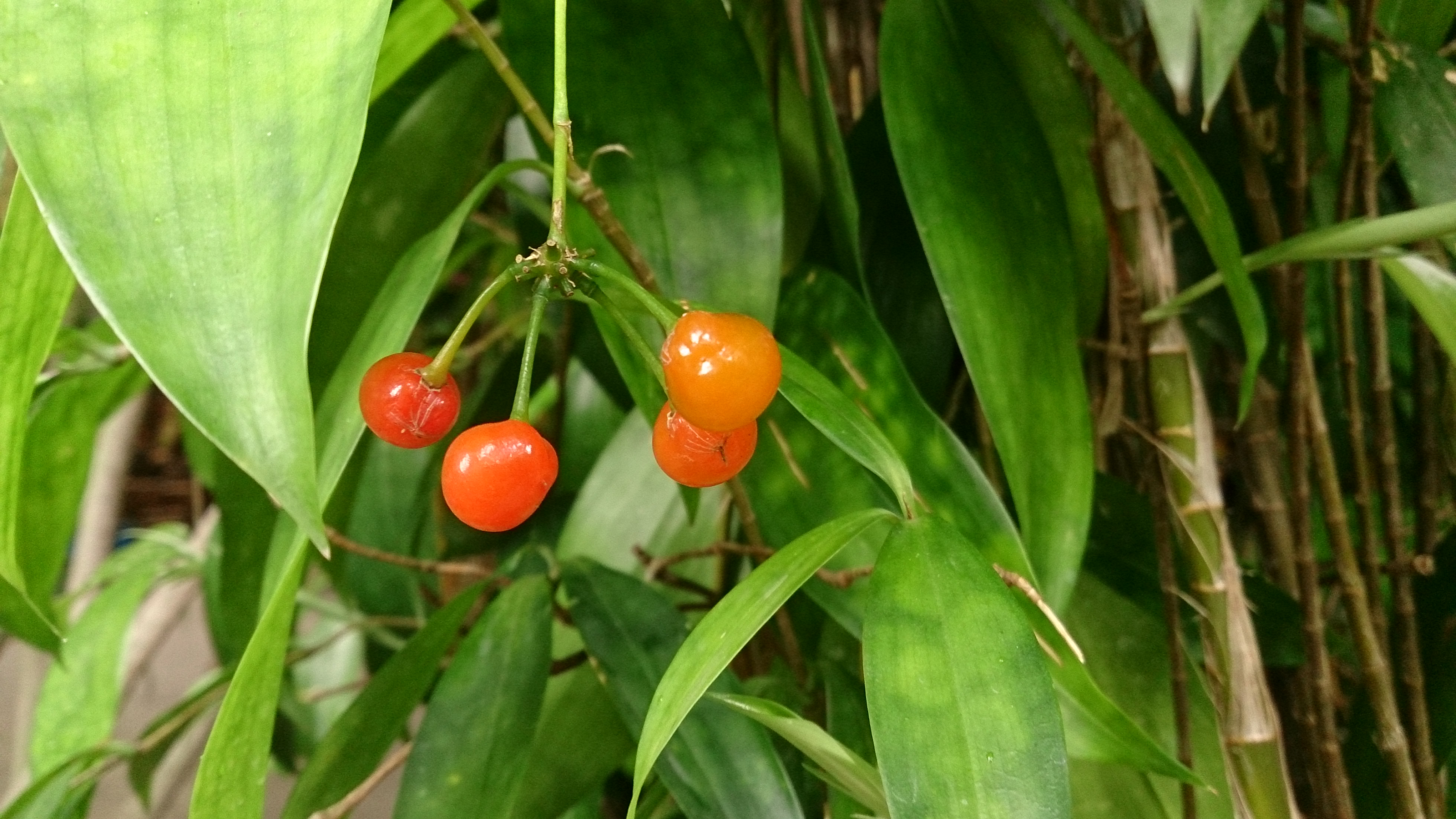
Fruit

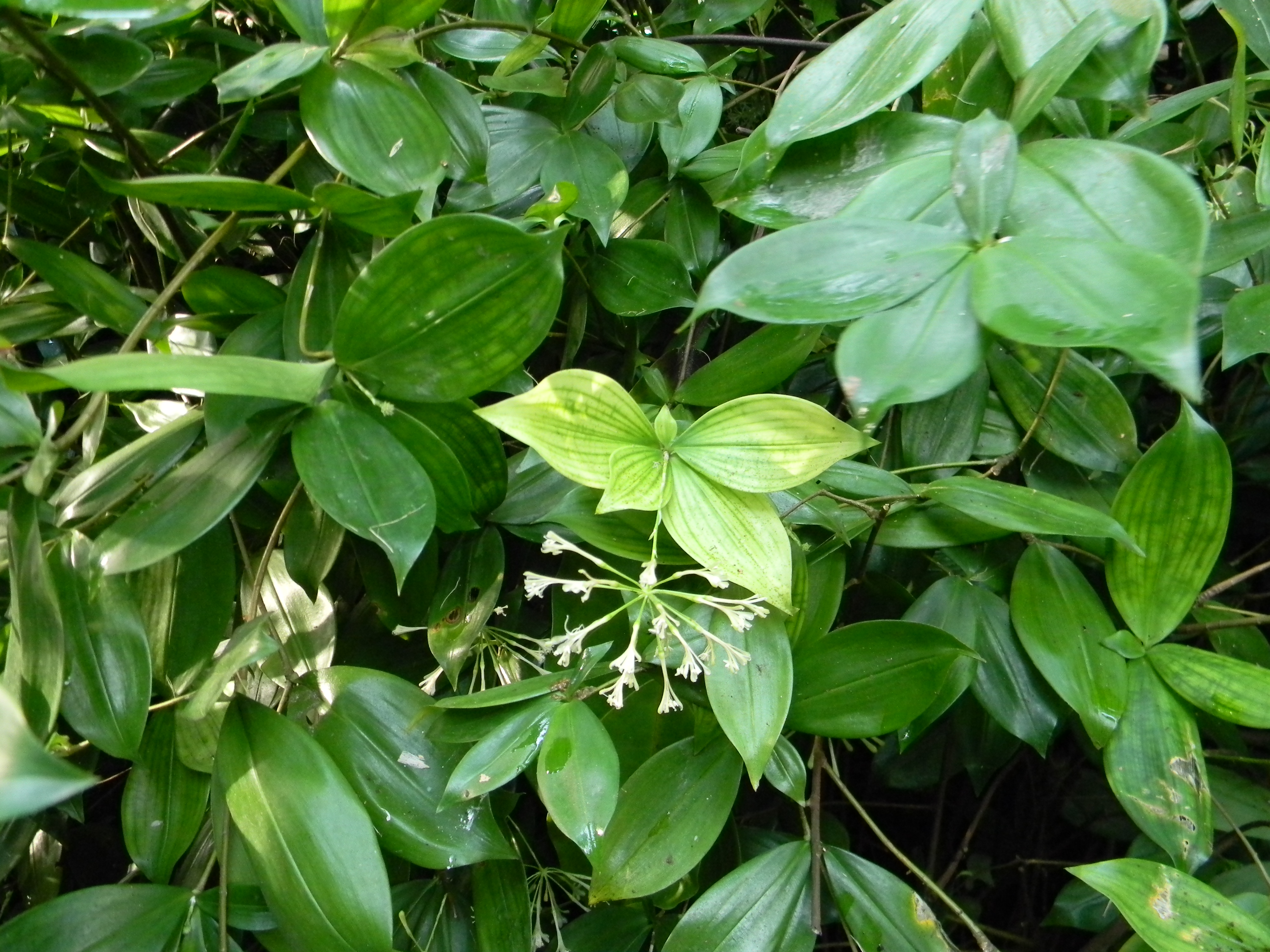
Dracaena surculosa var. maculata

Media related to Dracaena surculosa at Wikimedia Commons
