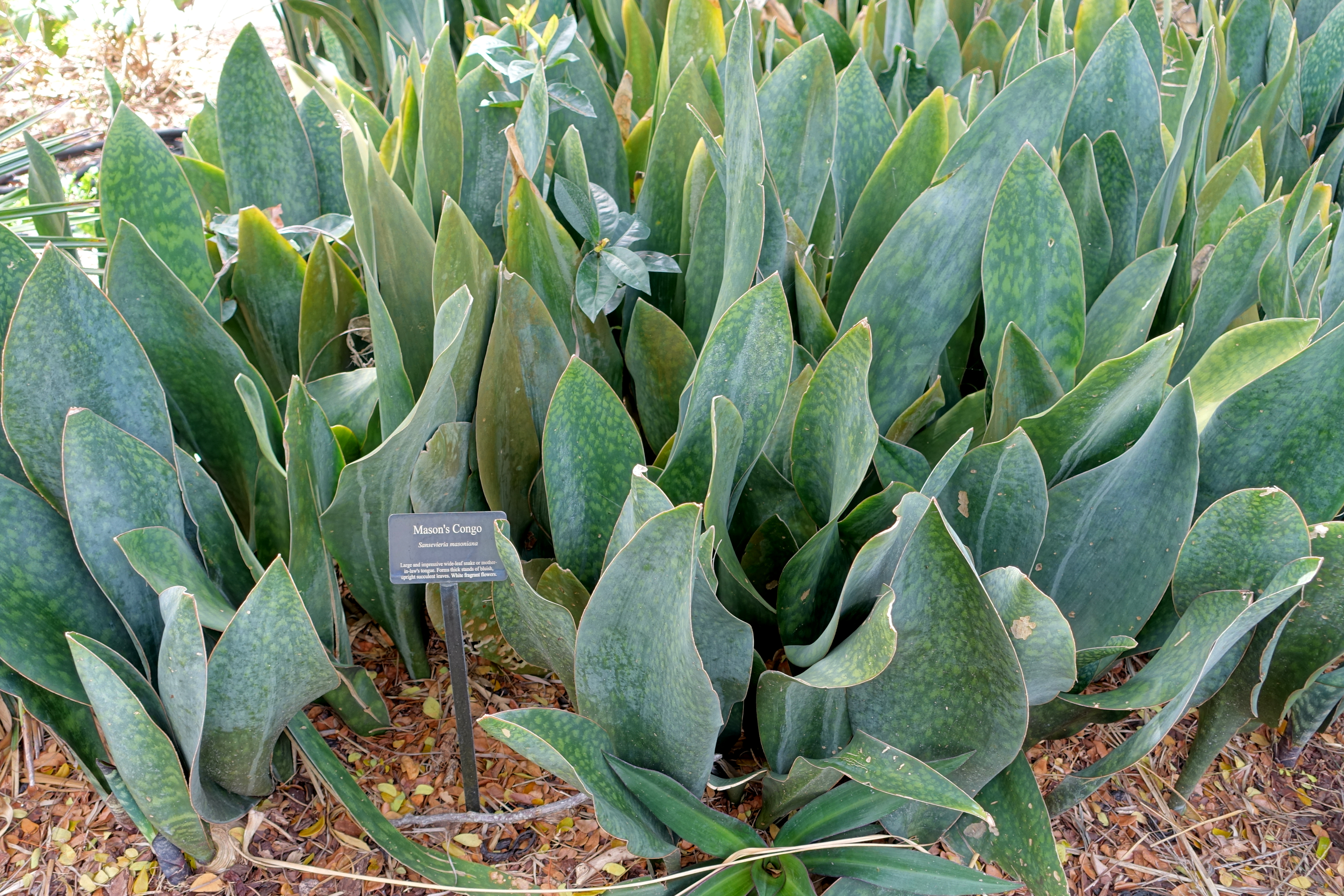

Scientific classification
- Kingdom: Plantae
- Clade: Tracheophytes
- Clade: Angiosperms
- Clade: Monocots
- Order: Asparagales
- Family: Asparagaceae
- Subfamily: Nolinoideae
- Genus: Dracaena
- Species: D. masoniana

Binomial name
- Dracaena masoniana (Chahin.) Byng & Christenh.

Synonyms
- Sansevieria masoniana Chahin.

= Dracaena masoniana =

Species of flowering plant

Dracaena masoniana, synonym Sansevieria masoniana, is a species of Dracaena native to Africa and originally collected in the Democratic Republic of the Congo. It was initially known in cultivation under the cultivar name 'Mason Congo'. Commonly grown as a houseplant for its striking foliage, it can survive in bright filtered light or shade and with infrequent watering. Often grown as a single large, stiff leaf in pots, the plant's other common names include "whale fin" or "shark's fin".
