= Dracaena malawiana =

Scientific classification
- Kingdom: Plantae
- Clade: Tracheophytes
- Clade: Angiosperms
- Clade: Monocots
- Order: Asparagales
- Family: Asparagaceae
- Subfamily: Nolinoideae
- Genus: Dracaena
- Species: D. malawiana

Binomial name
- Dracaena malawiana Byng & Christenh.

Synonyms
- Sansevieria formosa Chahin.

Species of flowering plant

Dracaena malawiana, synonym Sansevieria formosa, is a species of Dracaena native to Malawi. It was originally collected at the Kapichira Falls in south Malawi.

== Taxonomy ==
The species was originally described in 2012 by B. Juan Chahinian as Sansevieria formosa. However, it was renamed Dracaena malawiana in 2018, when all Sansevieria species were moved to the genus Dracaena. The species could not be named Dracaena formosa as that name had already been used by W.Bull in 1874 and is now considered a synonym of Cordyline fruticosa.
