= Dracaena afromontana =

Conservation status
- Least Concern (IUCN 3.1)

Scientific classification
- Kingdom: Plantae
- Clade: Embryophytes
- Clade: Tracheophytes
- Clade: Angiosperms
- Clade: Monocots
- Order: Asparagales
- Family: Asparagaceae
- Subfamily: Convallarioideae
- Genus: Dracaena
- Species: D. afromontana

Binomial name
- Dracaena afromontana Mildbr.

Species of flowering plant

Dracaena afromontana is a species of flowering plant in the family Asparagaceae, native to the highlands of eastern tropical Africa; South Sudan (Imatong Mountains), Ethiopia, the Democratic Republic of the Congo, Rwanda, Burundi, Uganda, Kenya, Tanzania, and Malawi. It is used as a street tree in Kigali, Rwanda.
