= Dracaena konaensis =

Hawaiʻi hala pepe

Conservation status
- Endangered (IUCN 2.3)

Scientific classification
- Kingdom: Plantae
- Clade: Tracheophytes
- Clade: Angiosperms
- Clade: Monocots
- Order: Asparagales
- Family: Asparagaceae
- Subfamily: Convallarioideae
- Genus: Dracaena
- Species: D. konaensis

Binomial name
- Dracaena konaensis (H.St.John) Jankalski

Synonyms
- Chrysodracon hawaiiensis (O.Deg. & I.Deg.) P.L.Lu & Morden; Pleomele hawaiiensis O.Deg. & I.Deg.; Pleomele kaupulehuensis H.St.John; Pleomele konaensis H.St.John

Species of flowering plant endemic to the island of Hawaiʻi

Dracaena konaensis, synonym Pleomele hawaiiensis, the Hawaiʻi hala pepe, is a rare species of flowering plant that is endemic to the island of Hawaiʻi in the state of Hawaii.

It inhabits dry forests on old ʻaʻā lava flows at elevations of 300–800 metres (980–2,620 ft) on the leeward side of the island.

Associated plants include: ʻōhiʻa lehua (Metrosideros polymorpha), lama (Diospyros sandwicensis), māmane (Sophora chrysophylla), alaheʻe (Psydrax odorata), huehue (Cocculus orbiculatus), naio (Myoporum sandwicense), olopua (Nestegis sandwicensis), kuluʻī (Nototrichium sandwicense), ʻilima (Sida fallax), wiliwili (Erythrina sandwicensis), ʻiliahi (Santalum spp.), ʻūlei (Osteomeles anthyllidifolia), uhiuhi (Caesalpinia kavaiensis), kauila (Colubrina oppositifolia), maʻoloa (Neraudia ovata), maiapilo (Capparis sandwichiana), Bidens micrantha ssp. ctenophylla, and ʻaiea (Nothocestrum breviflorum).

There are 300 to 400 individuals remaining. It is an endangered species, threatened with habitat loss and modification.

The flowers of this plant were used in leis and the wood in carvings.
