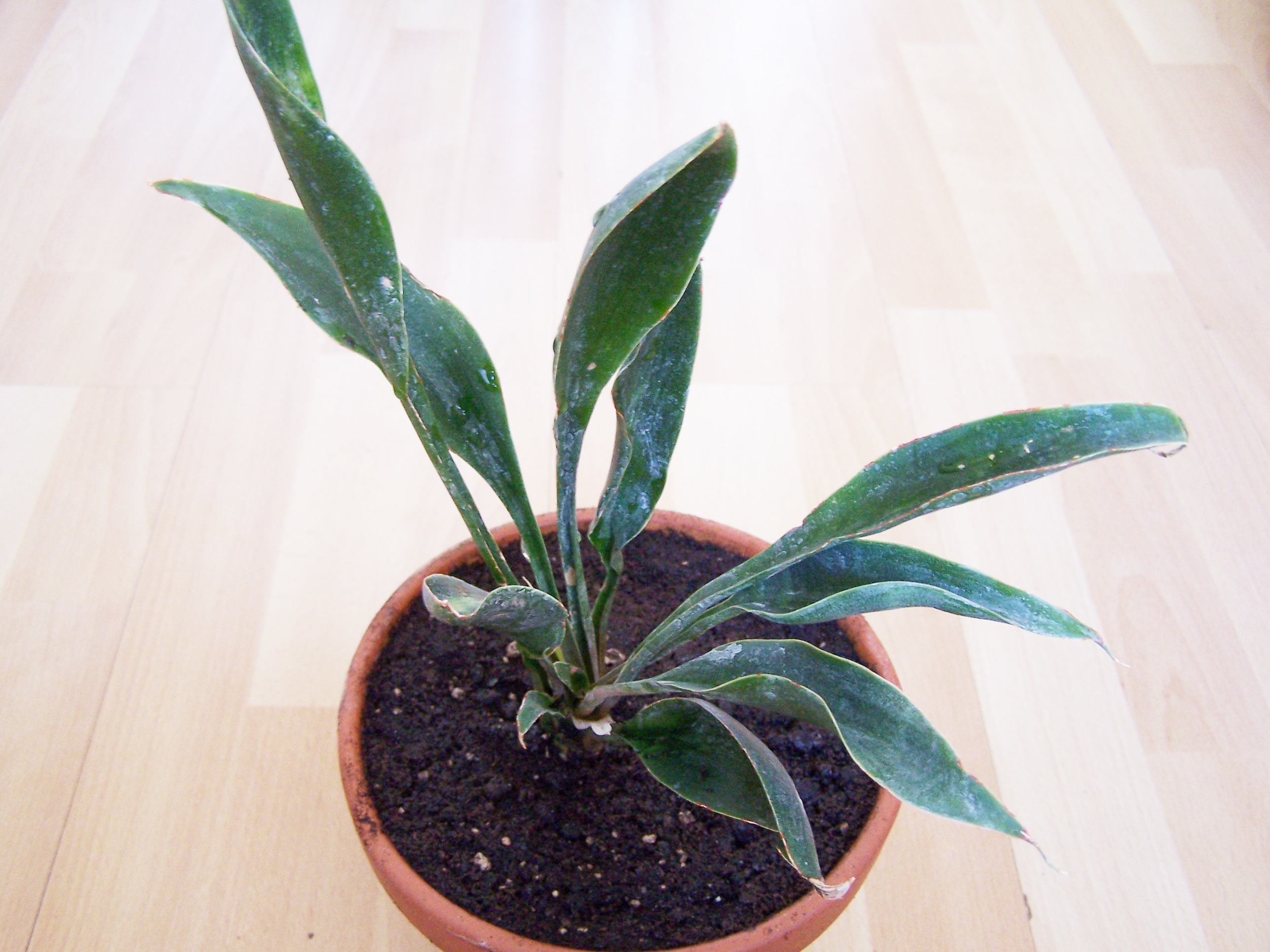

Scientific classification
- Kingdom: Plantae
- Clade: Embryophytes
- Clade: Tracheophytes
- Clade: Angiosperms
- Clade: Monocots
- Order: Asparagales
- Family: Asparagaceae
- Subfamily: Convallarioideae
- Genus: Dracaena
- Species: D. spathulata

Binomial name
- Dracaena spathulata Byng & Christenh.

Synonyms
- Sansevieria concinna N.E.Br.; Sansevieria subspicata var. concinna (N.E.Br.) Mbugua

= Dracaena spathulata =

Species of flowering plant

Dracaena spathulata is a species of flowering plant in the family Asparagaceae, native to South Africa (KwaZulu-Natal), Mozambique, Zimbabwe, and Tanzania. It was previously known under the synonym Sansevieria concinna.

== Habitat ==
In the wild, Dracaena spathulata grows in sandy soils under the shade of coastal forests.
