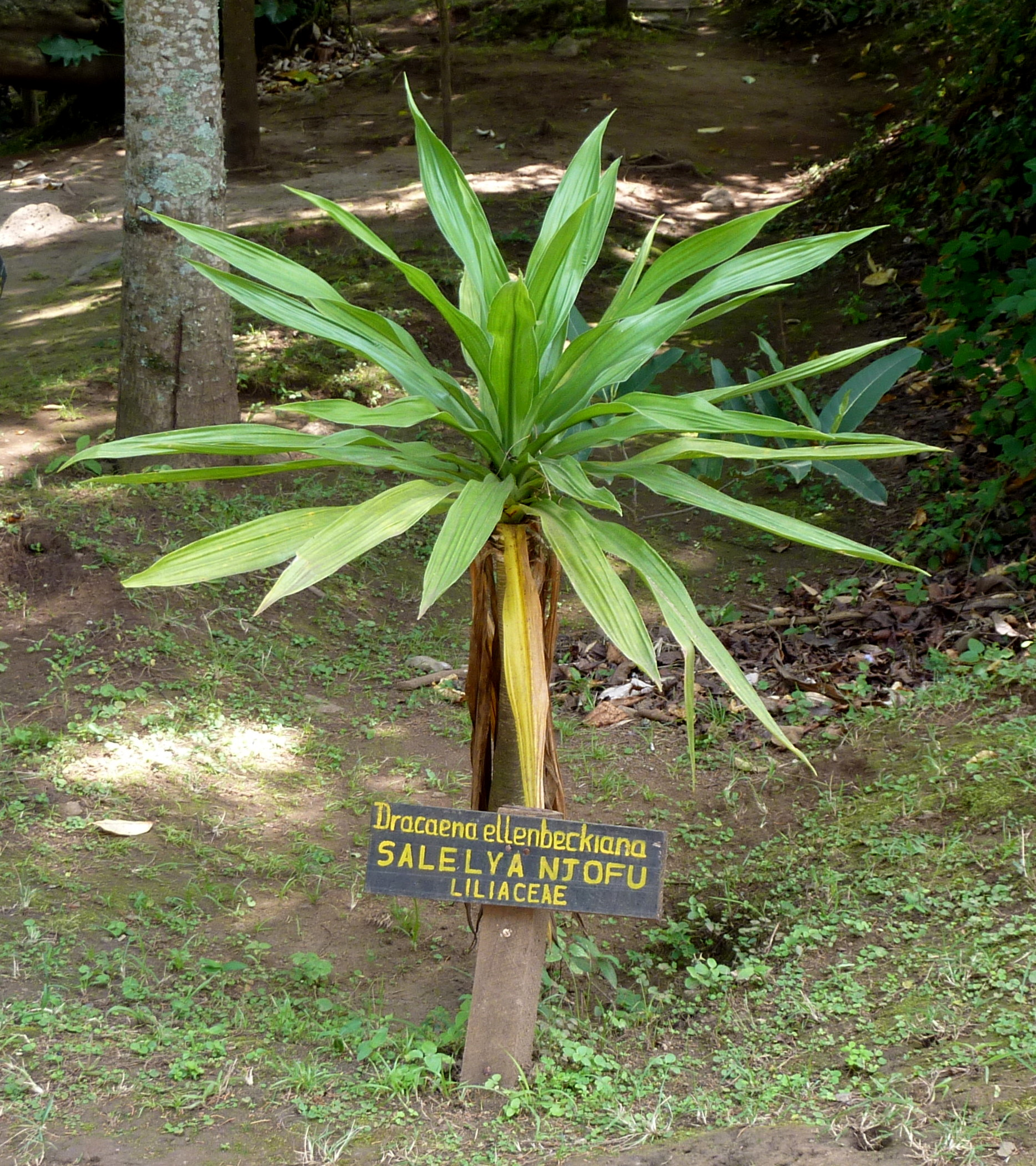

Conservation status
- Least Concern (IUCN 3.1)

Scientific classification
- Kingdom: Plantae
- Clade: Tracheophytes
- Clade: Angiosperms
- Clade: Monocots
- Order: Asparagales
- Family: Asparagaceae
- Subfamily: Convallarioideae
- Genus: Dracaena
- Species: D. ellenbeckiana

Binomial name
- Dracaena ellenbeckiana Engl. (1902)

= Dracaena ellenbeckiana =

Species of plant

Dracaena ellenbeckiana is a species of plant belonging to the Asparagaceae family, subfamily Convallarioideae (formerly Nolinoideae). Dracaena ellenbeckiana is native to Ethiopia, Kenya, Somalia, Sudan, and Uganda, and primarily grows in the seasonally dry tropical biome.

== Taxonomy and morphology ==
Dracaena ellenbeckiana was first described by Engl. in 1902. The species is a shrub or tree, growing 2-8 meters high, with erect stems that are often several from a common base, less often solitary, and little-branched. The stems can be up to 8 cm (3.1 in) in diameter and are longitudinally fissured. The leaves of Dracaena species are isobilateral and amphistomatic, with anomocytic and tetracytic stomata. The plants are either xeromorphic or mesomorphic and their leaves can grow up to 22–65cm long, 1–9cm wide.

== Habitat and ecology ==
Dracaena ellenbeckiana is adapted to the seasonally dry tropical biome, which is characterized by alternating wet and dry seasons. This habitat has shaped the species' ability to tolerate drought, making it an excellent candidate for cultivation in subtropical climates and as a houseplant. The species is found in countries such as Ethiopia, Kenya, Somalia, Sudan, and Uganda.
