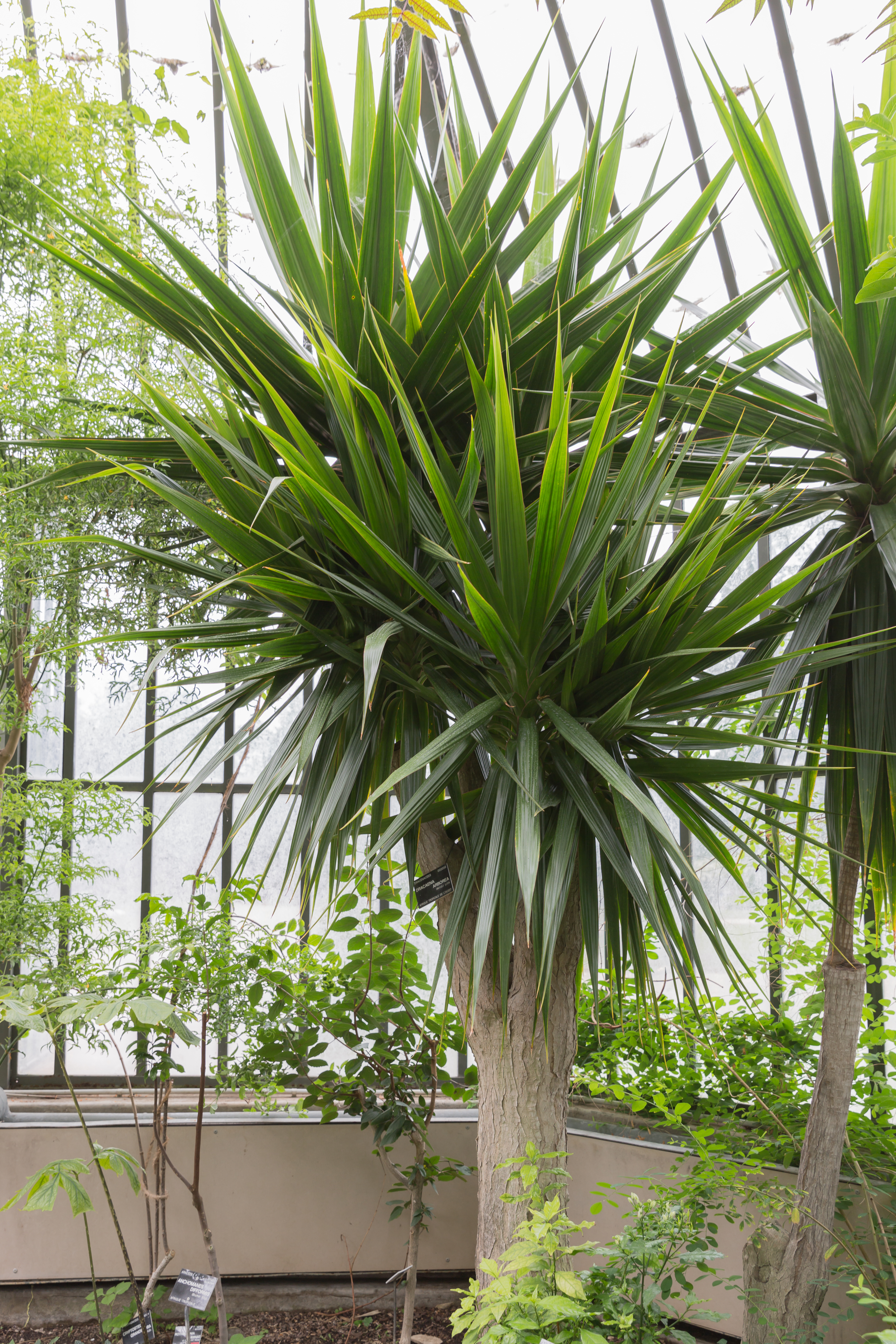
- At the Jardin botanique de Lyon
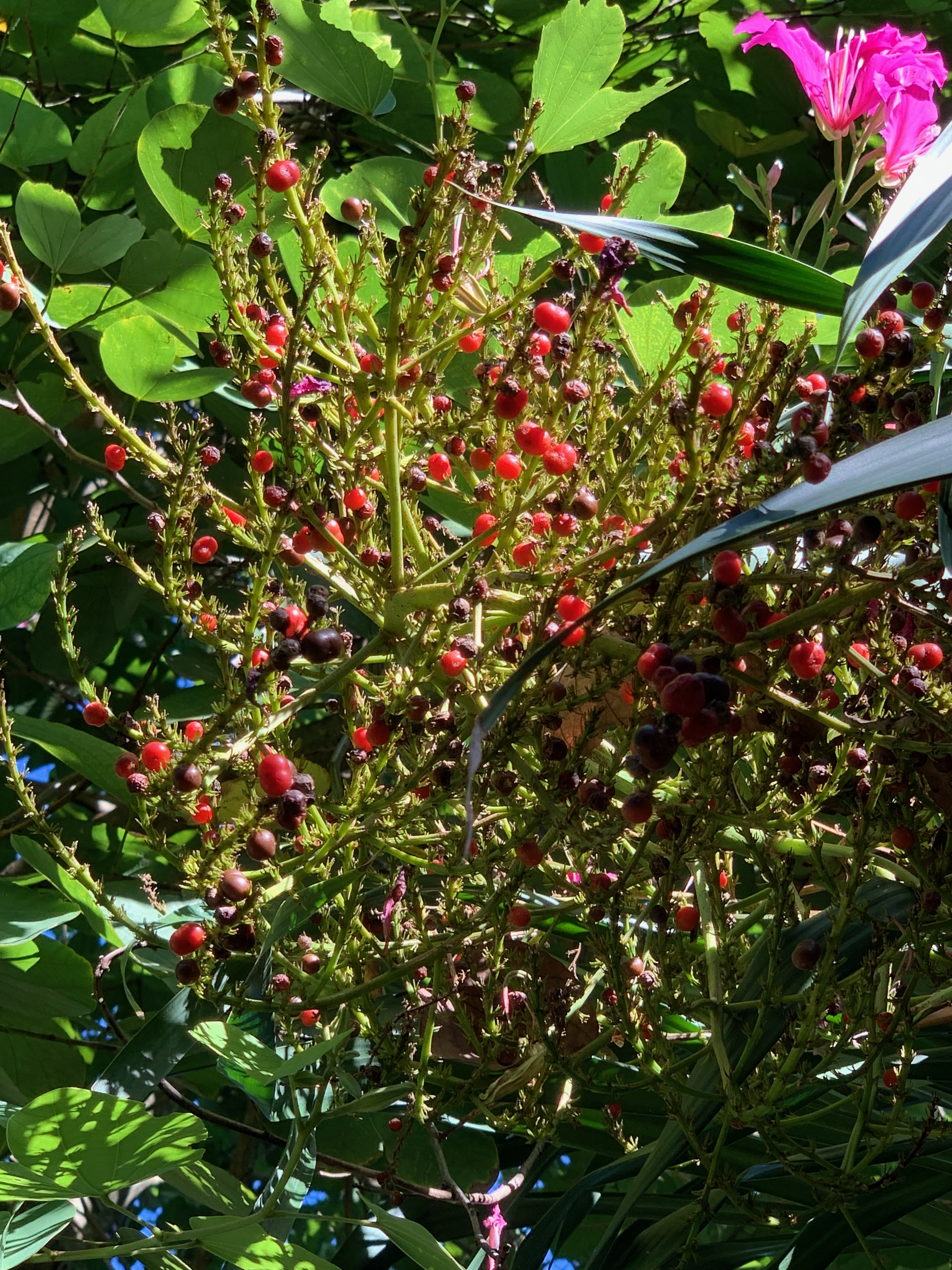
- Fruit

Scientific classification
- Kingdom: Plantae
- Clade: Tracheophytes
- Clade: Angiosperms
- Clade: Monocots
- Order: Asparagales
- Family: Asparagaceae
- Subfamily: Convallarioideae
- Genus: Dracaena
- Species: D. arborea

Binomial name
- Dracaena arborea (Willd.) Link

Synonyms
- List: Aletris arborea Willd.; Cordyline arborea (Willd.) Göpp.; Dracaena arborea var. baumannii Engl.; Dracaena excelsa Ten.; Dracaena knerkiana K.Koch; Draco arborea (Willd.) Kuntze; Pleomele arborea (Willd.) N.E.Br.

= Dracaena arborea =

Species of flowering plant

Dracaena arborea, the tree dracaena, is a species of flowering plant in the family Asparagaceae, native to western and west-central wet tropical Africa. It is used as a street tree in a number of African and Brazilian cities.

== Description ==
A medium-sized tree often reaching 20 m (66 ft) in height, sometimes up to 30 m (98 ft), with width up to 30 cm (12 in) in diameter. The stem tend to be yellowish brown when young but greyish when mature. Leaves commonly exceed 40 cm (16 in) in length, sometimes reaching up to 150 cm (59 in), and width often exceeds 4 cm (1.6 in) reaching up to 10 cm (4 in) in width; leaves are narrowly oblanceolate in outline. Inflorescence arranged in pendulous panicles, flowers bunched in groups of 3 to 5 and at the end of branches.

== Uses ==
Draceena arborea is often planted around burial sites to demarcate boundaries in parts of Cameroon and Burundi and is also planted for ornamental uses. In parts of Cameroon, a decoction composed of root extracts mixed with palm wine is sold to people who are told that it will improve male sexual function.
