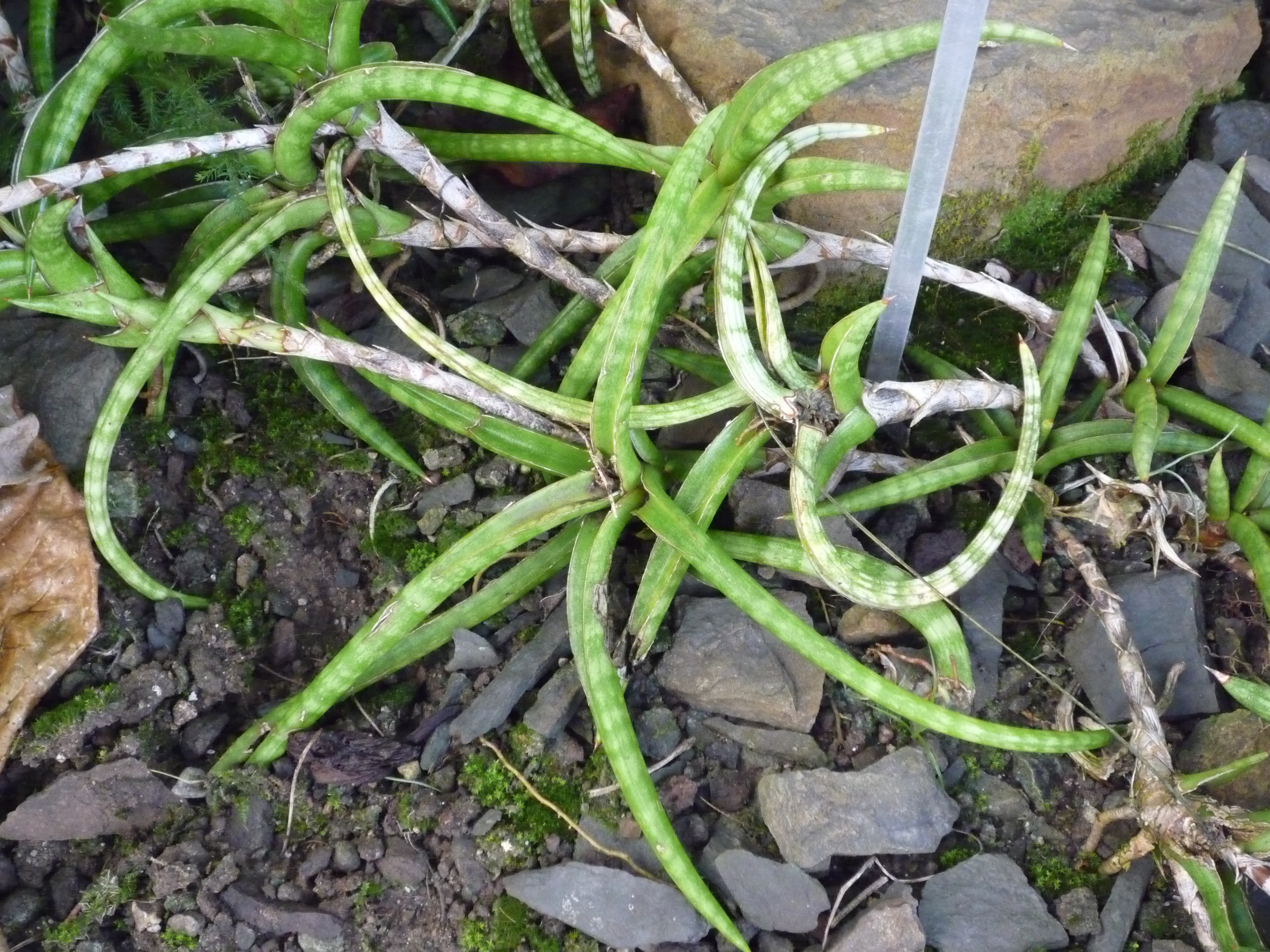
- Dracaena ballyi growing at the Meise Botanic Garden

Scientific classification
- Kingdom: Plantae
- Clade: Tracheophytes
- Clade: Angiosperms
- Clade: Monocots
- Order: Asparagales
- Family: Asparagaceae
- Subfamily: Nolinoideae
- Genus: Dracaena
- Species: D. ballyi

Binomial name
- Dracaena ballyi (L.E.Newton) Byng & Christenh.

Synonyms
- Sansevieria ballyi L.E.Newton

= Dracaena ballyi =

Species of plant

Dracaena ballyi is a species of succulent plant native to Kenya and Tanzania. It grows in small rosettes with leaves that have bands of color and sharp tips. Originally collected by Peter Bally in 1963 and long cultivated as a houseplant, it was scientifically described in 2004.

== Hybrids ==
Artificial hybrids with Dracaena parva have been obtained.
