= List of Dracaena species =

Dracaena is a genus of plants in the family Asparagaceae. As of October 2024, Plants of the World Online accepted 198 species.

== A ==
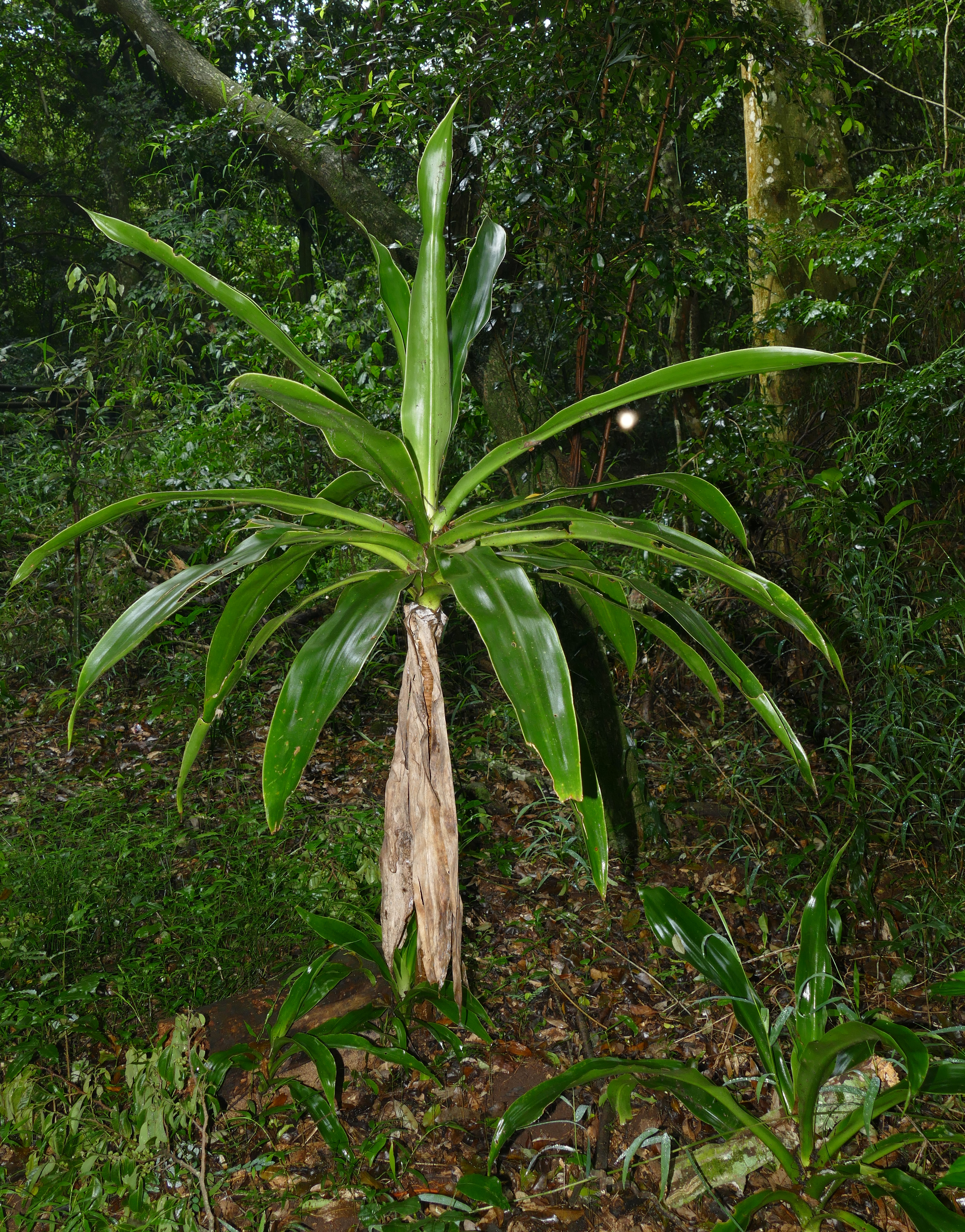
Dracaena aletriformis

- Dracaena acaulis Baker
- Dracaena acutissima Hua
- Dracaena adamii Hepper
- Dracaena aethiopica (Thunb.) Byng & Christenh.
- Dracaena afromontana Mildbr.
- Dracaena ajgal (Benabid & Cuzin) Rivas Mart., Molero Mesa, Marfíl & G.Benítez
- Dracaena aletriformis (Haw.) Bos
- Dracaena angolensis (Welw. ex Carrière) Byng & Christenh.
- Dracaena angustifolia (Medik.) Roxb.
- Dracaena arborea (Willd.) Link
- Dracaena arborescens (Cornu ex Gérôme & Labroy) Byng & Christenh.
- Dracaena ascendens (L.E.Newton) Byng & Christenh.
- Dracaena aubryana Brongn.
- Dracaena aubrytiana (Carrière) Byng & Christenh.
- Dracaena aurea H.Mann

== B ==
- Dracaena bacularis (Pfennig ex A.Butler & Jankalski) Byng & Christenh.
- Dracaena bagamoyensis (N.E.Br.) Byng & Christenh.
- Dracaena ballyi (L.E.Newton) Byng & Christenh.
- Dracaena bhitalae (R.H.Webb & L.E.Newton) Takaw.-Ny. & Mucina
- Dracaena bicolor Hook.
- Dracaena borneensis (Merr.) Jankalski
- Dracaena brachystachys Hook.f.
- Dracaena braunii Engl.
- Dracaena breviflora Ridl.
- Dracaena brevifolia (L.E.Newton) Takaw.-Ny. & Thiede
- Dracaena bueana Engl.
- Dracaena bugandana Byng & Christenh.
- Dracaena bukedea Takaw.-Ny. & Mucina
- Dracaena burdettii (Chahin.) Byng & Christenh.
- Dracaena burmanica (N.E.Br.) Byng & Christenh.
- Dracaena bushii Damen

== C ==
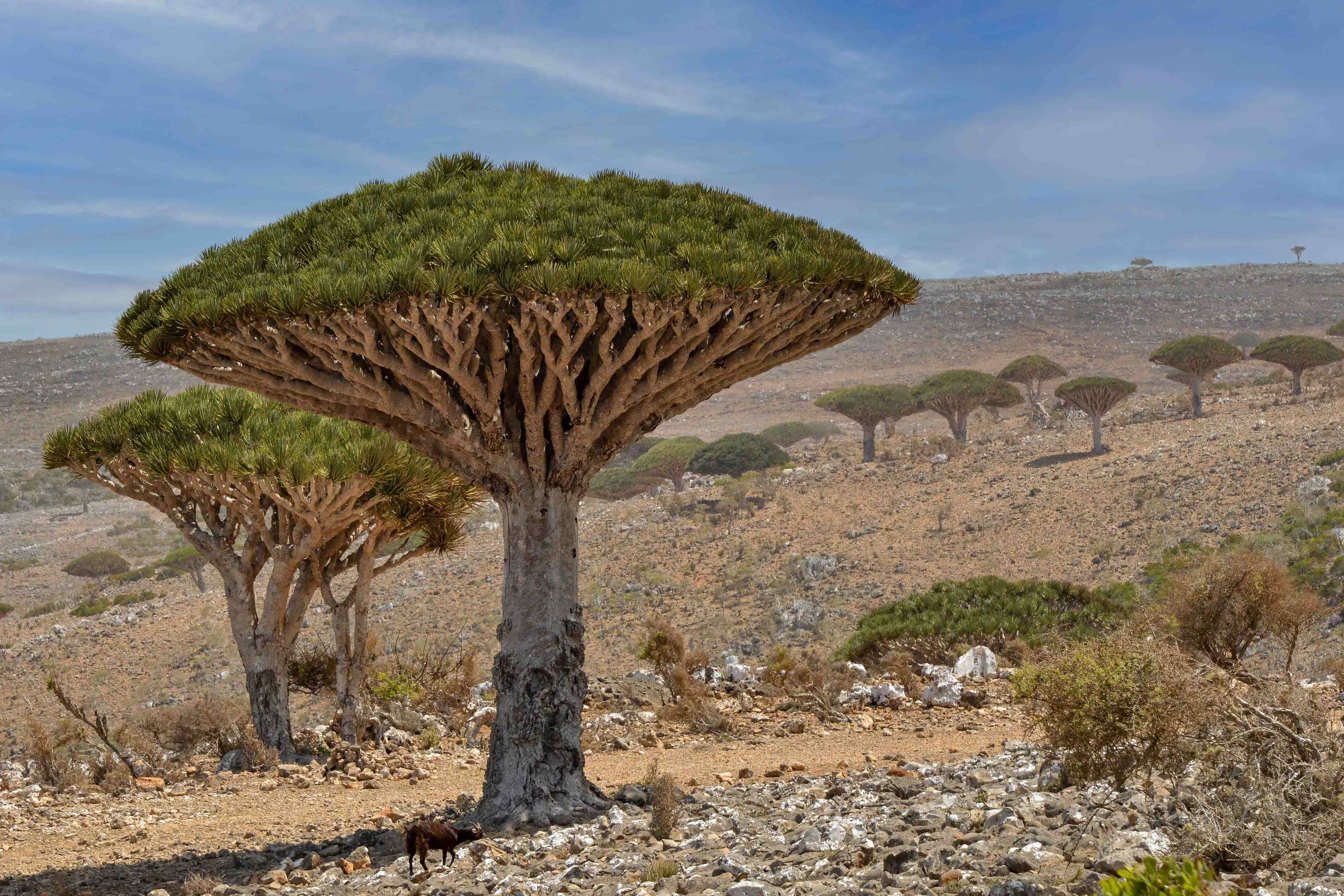
Dracaena cinnabari

- Dracaena caboverdeana (Marrero Rodr. & R.S.Almeida) Rivas Mart., Lousã, J.C.Costa & Maria C.Duarte
- Dracaena calocephala Bos
- Dracaena cambodiana Pierre ex Gagnep.
- Dracaena camerooniana Baker
- Dracaena canaliculata (Carrière) Byng & Christenh.
- Dracaena cantleyi Baker
- Dracaena caulescens (N.E.Br.) Byng & Christenh.
- Dracaena cerasifera Hua
- Dracaena chahinianii (R.H.Webb & Myklebust) Takaw.-Ny. & Mucina
- Dracaena chiniana I.M.Turner
- Dracaena cincta Baker
- Dracaena cinnabari Balf.f.
- Dracaena cochinchinensis (Lour.) S.C.Chen
- Dracaena coleana (T.G.Forrest) Takaw.-Ny. & Thiede
- Dracaena concinna Kunth
- Dracaena conduplicata (T.C.Cole & T.G.Forrest) Takaw.-Ny. & Thiede
- Dracaena conferta Ridl.
- Dracaena congoensis Hua
- Dracaena conspicua (N.E.Br.) Byng & Christenh.
- Dracaena cristula W.Bull
- Dracaena cubensis Vict.
- Dracaena curtisii Ridl.
- Dracaena cuspidata Ridl.

== D ==
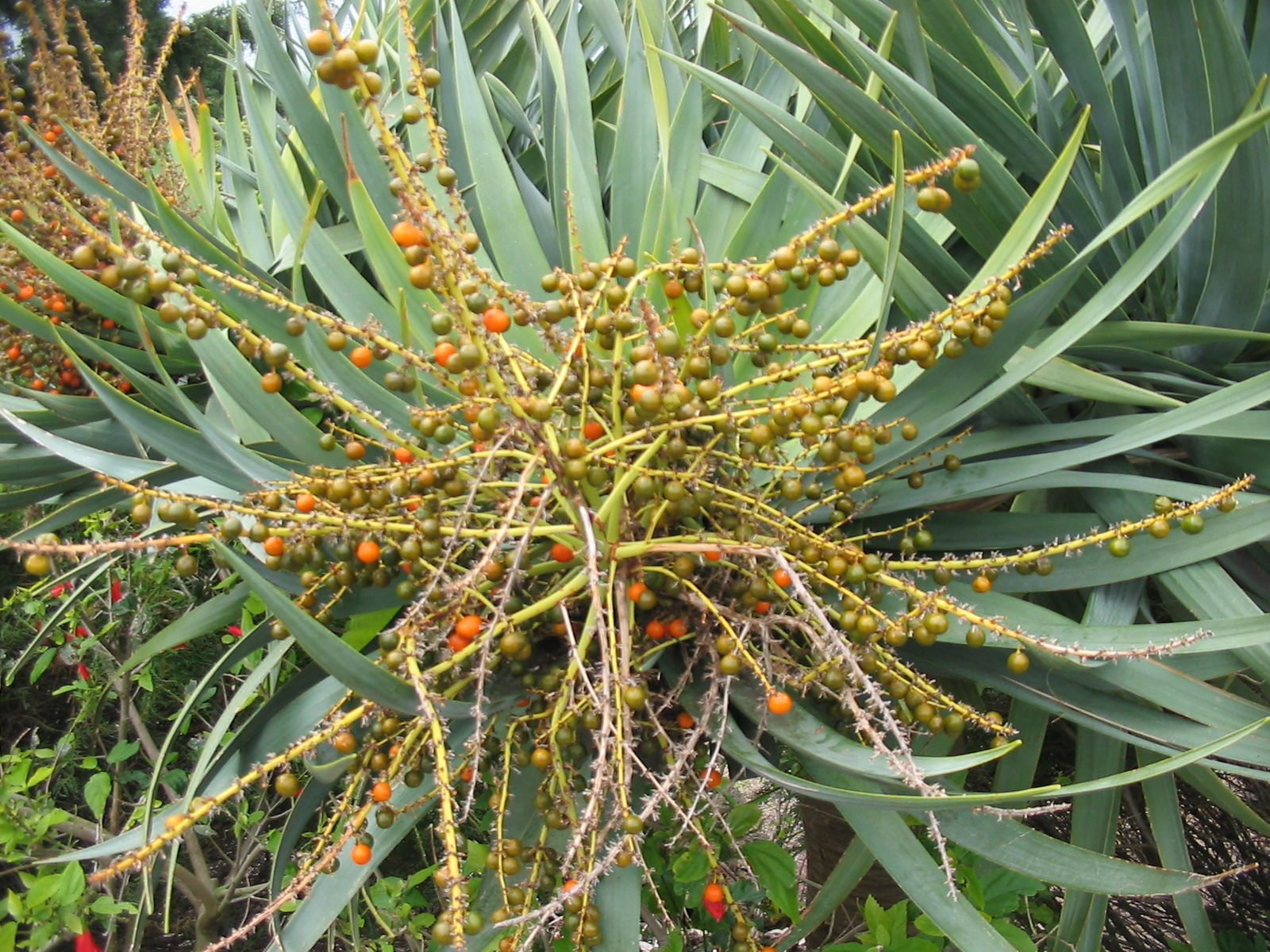
Dracaena draco fruits

- Dracaena dawei (Stapf) Byng & Christenh.
- Dracaena dhofarica (T.A.McCoy & Lavranos) Takaw.-Ny. & Mucina
- Dracaena disticha (R.H.Webb & L.E.Newton) M.H.J.van der Meer
- Dracaena dooneri (N.E.Br.) Byng & Christenh.
- Dracaena downsii (Chahin.) Byng & Christenh.
- Dracaena draco (L.) L.
- Dracaena dumetescens (L.E.Newton) Byng & Christenh.

== E ==
- Dracaena ebracteata (Cav.) Byng & Christenh.
- Dracaena eilensis (Chahin.) Byng & Christenh.
- Dracaena ellenbeckiana Engl.
- Dracaena elliptica Thunb. & Dalm.
- Dracaena enchiridiofolia (R.H.Webb & L.E.Newton) Takaw.-Ny. & Thiede
- Dracaena erythraeae (Mattei) Byng & Christenh.

== F ==
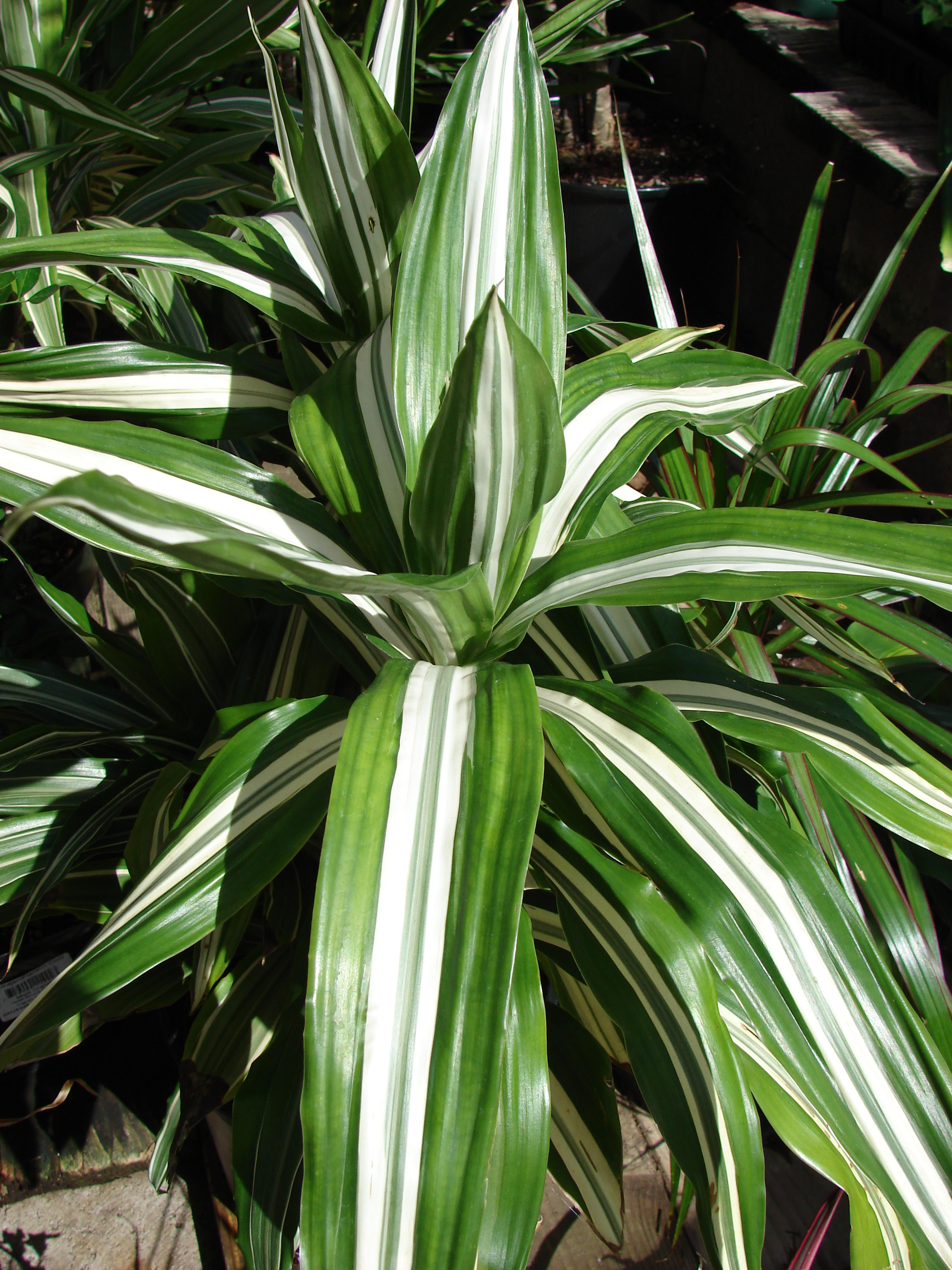
Dracaena fragrans

- Dracaena fasciata (Cornu ex Gérôme & Labroy) Byng & Christenh.
- Dracaena fernaldii (H.St.John) Jankalski
- Dracaena finlaysonii Baker
- Dracaena floribunda Baker
- Dracaena fontanesiana Schult. & Schult.f.
- Dracaena forbesii (O.Deg.) Jankalski
- Dracaena forestii (L.E.Newton & R.H.Webb) Takaw.-Ny. & Thiede
- Dracaena forskaliana (Schult. & Schult.f.) Byng & Christenh.
- Dracaena fragrans (L.) Ker Gawl.
- Dracaena francisii (Chahin.) Byng & Christenh.
- Dracaena frequens (Chahin.) Byng & Christenh.

== G ==
- Dracaena ghiesbreghtii W.Bull ex J.J.Blandy
- Dracaena glomerata Baker
- Dracaena goldieana Bullen ex Mast. & T.Moore
- Dracaena gracillima (Chahin.) Byng & Christenh.
- Dracaena granulata Hook.f.

== H ==
- Dracaena haemanthoides Bos ex Damen
- Dracaena halapepe (H.St.John) Jankalski
- Dracaena halemanuensis Jankalski
- Dracaena hallii (Chahin.) Byng & Christenh.
- Dracaena hanningtonii Baker
- Dracaena hargeisana (Chahin.) Byng & Christenh.
- Dracaena hewittii Ridl.
- Dracaena hokouensis G.Z.Ye
- Dracaena hosei (Ridl.) Jankalski
- Dracaena humiflora (D.J.Richards) Byng & Christenh.
- Dracaena hyacinthoides (L.) Mabb.

== I ==
- Dracaena impressivenia Yu H.Yan & H.J.Guo
- Dracaena itumei (Mbugua) Byng & Christenh.

== J ==
- Dracaena jayniana Wilkin & Suksathan
- Dracaena jiewhoei Hambali, Sulist. & Rugayah

== K ==
- Dracaena kaweesakii Wilkin & Suksathan
- Dracaena kindtiana De Wild.
- Dracaena kirkii Baker
- Dracaena konaensis (H.St.John) Jankalski
- Dracaena kupensis Mwachala, Cheek, Eb.Fisch. & Muasya

== L ==
- Dracaena laevifolia (R.H.Webb & L.E.Newton) Takaw.-Ny. & Mucina
- Dracaena lancea Thunb. & Dalm.
- Dracaena lancifolia (Ridl.) Jankalski
- Dracaena lavranii (R.H.Webb & Myklebust) Takaw.-Ny. & Mucina
- Dracaena laxissima Engl.
- Dracaena liberica (Gérôme & Labroy) Byng & Christenh.
- Dracaena longiflora (Sims) Byng & Christenh.
- Dracaena longifolia Ridl.
- Dracaena longistyla (la Croix) Byng & Christenh.
- Dracaena lunatifolia (L.E.Newton) Byng & Christenh.

== M ==
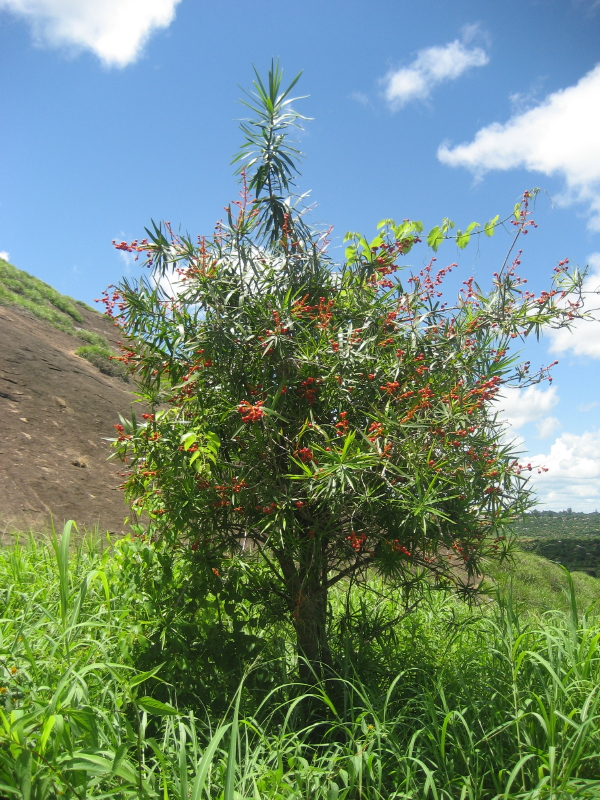
Dracaena mannii

- Dracaena malawiana Byng & Christenh.
- Dracaena mannii Baker
- Dracaena marachiensis (T.G.Forrest) Takaw.-Ny. & Thiede
- Dracaena marina Bos ex Damen
- Dracaena masoniana (Chahin.) Byng & Christenh.
- Dracaena mikephillipsii (R.H.Webb & L.E.Newton) M.H.J.van der Meer
- Dracaena mokoko Mwachala & Cheek
- Dracaena multiflora Warb. ex P.Sarasin & Sarasin

== N ==
- Dracaena neobella N.Wei, Mwachala, G.W.Hu & Q.F.Wang
- Dracaena neorobusta Idrees & Z.Yong Zhang
- Dracaena newtoniana (T.G.Forrest) Byng & Christenh.
- Dracaena nilotica (Baker) Byng & Christenh.
- Dracaena nitens Welw. ex Baker
- Dracaena nitida (Chahin.) Byng & Christenh.
- Dracaena novoguineensis Gibbs
- Dracaena nyangensis Pellegr.

== O ==
- Dracaena ombet Kotschy & Peyr.
- Dracaena ovata Ker Gawl.

== P ==
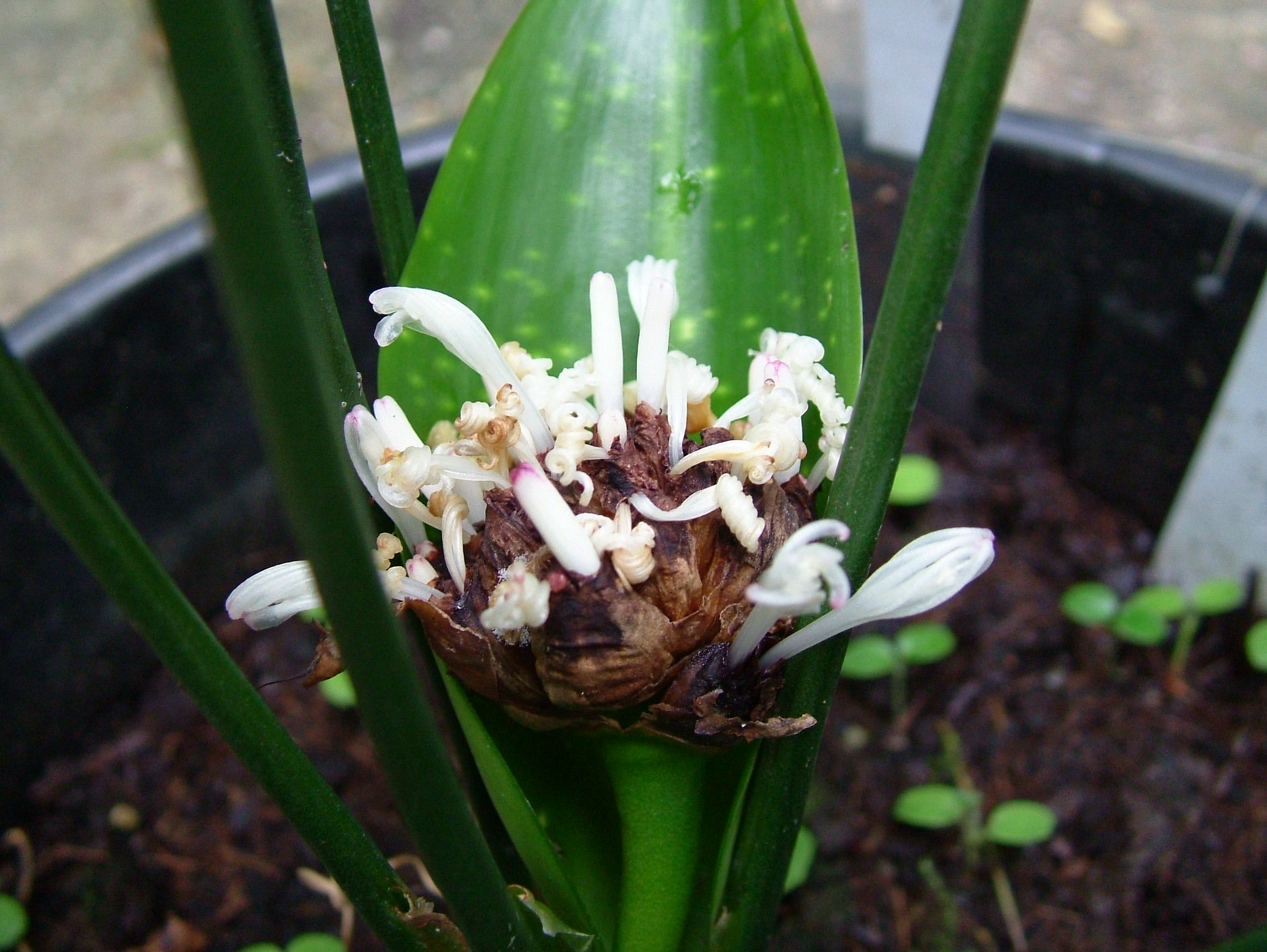
Dracaena phrynioides

- Dracaena parva (N.E.Br.) Byng & Christenh.
- Dracaena parviflora Baker
- Dracaena pearsonii (N.E.Br.) Byng & Christenh.
- Dracaena pedicellata (la Croix) Byng & Christenh.
- Dracaena penangensis Ridl.
- Dracaena pendula Ridl.
- Dracaena perrotii (O.Warburg) Byng & Christenh.
- Dracaena perrottetii Baker
- Dracaena pethera Byng & Christenh.
- Dracaena pfennigii (Mbugua) Takaw.-Ny. & Thiede
- Dracaena pfisteri (D.J.Richards) Byng & Christenh.
- Dracaena phanerophlebia Baker
- Dracaena phillipsiae (N.E.Br.) Byng & Christenh.
- Dracaena phrynioides Hook.
- Dracaena pinguicula (P.R.O.Bally) Byng & Christenh.
- Dracaena porteri Baker
- Dracaena powellii (N.E.Br.) Byng & Christenh.
- Dracaena powysii (L.E.Newton) Byng & Christenh.
- Dracaena praetermissa Bos
- Dracaena purpurea (Ridl.) Jankalski

== R ==
- Dracaena raffillii (N.E.Br.) Byng & Christenh.
- Dracaena reflexa Lam.
- Dracaena rockii (H.St.John) Jankalski
- Dracaena rosulata Mwachala & Eb.Fisch.
- Dracaena roxburghiana (Schult. & Schult.f.) Byng & Christenh.
- Dracaena rugosifolia (R.H.Webb & L.E.Newton) Takaw.-Ny. & Thiede

== S ==
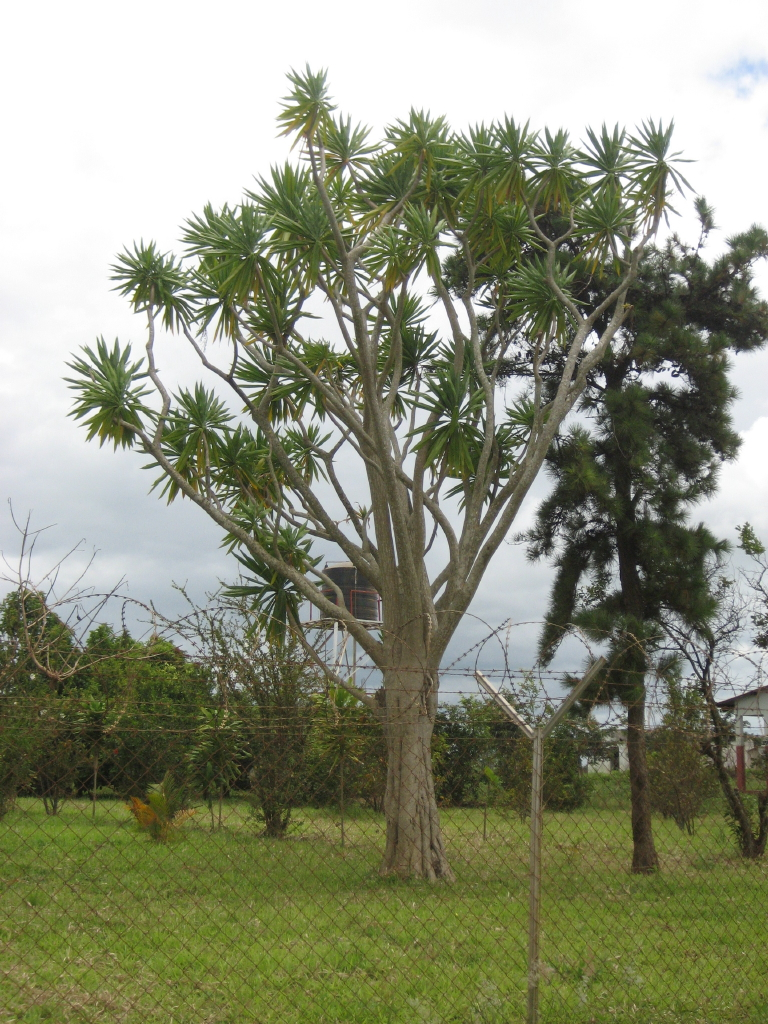
Dracaena steudneri

- Dracaena sambiranensis (H.Perrier) Byng & Christenh.
- Dracaena sanderiana Mast.
- Dracaena sarawakensis (W.W.Sm.) Jankalski
- Dracaena scabra Bos
- Dracaena scimitariformis (D.J.Richards) Byng & Christenh.
- Dracaena senegambica (Baker) Byng & Christenh.
- Dracaena serpenta Byng & Christenh.
- Dracaena serrulata Baker
- Dracaena siamica Ridl.
- Dracaena singapurensis Ridl.
- Dracaena singularis (N.E.Br.) Byng & Christenh.
- Dracaena sinus-simiorum (Chahin.) Byng & Christenh.
- Dracaena spathulata Byng & Christenh.
- Dracaena specksii (R.H.Webb & Myklebust) Takaw.-Ny. & Mucina
- Dracaena spicata Roxb.
- Dracaena steudneri Engl.
- Dracaena stuckyi (God.-Leb.) Byng & Christenh.
- Dracaena subspicata (Baker) Byng & Christenh.
- Dracaena subtilis (N.E.Br.) Byng & Christenh.
- Dracaena suffruticosa (N.E.Br.) Byng & Christenh.
- Dracaena surculosa Lindl.

== T ==
- Dracaena tamaranae Marrero Rodr., R.S.Almeida & Gonz.-Mart.
- Dracaena testudinea Byng & Christenh.
- Dracaena tholloniana Hua
- Dracaena thwaitesii Regel
- Dracaena timorensis Kunth
- Dracaena transvaalensis Baker
- Dracaena trifasciata (Prain) Mabb.

== U ==
- Dracaena umbraculifera Jacq.
- Dracaena umbratica Ridl.
- Dracaena usambarensis Engl.

== V ==
- Dracaena vanillosa (M.Burkart & Scharf) Takaw.-Ny. & Thiede
- Dracaena varians (N.E.Br.) Byng & Christenh.
- Dracaena viridiflora Engl. & K.Krause
- Dracaena volkensii (Gürke) Byng & Christenh.

== W ==
- Dracaena wakaensis Damen & Quiroz
- Dracaena waltersiae Damen

== X ==
- Dracaena xiphophylla Baker

== Y ==
- Dracaena yuccifolia Ridl.

== Z ==
- Dracaena zebra Byng & Christenh.
- Dracaena zeylanica (L.) Mabb.
