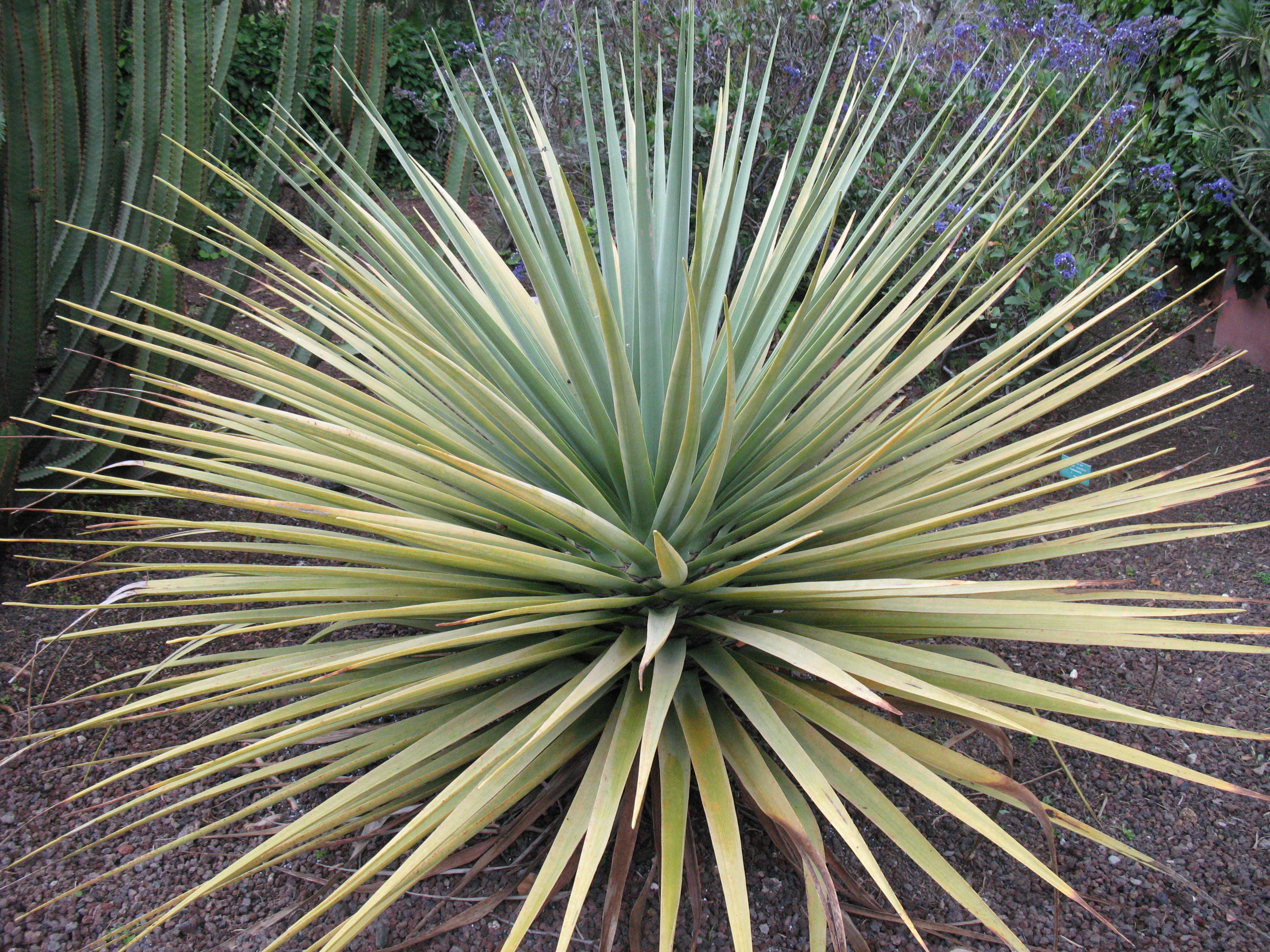

Conservation status
- Critically Endangered (IUCN 3.1)

Scientific classification
- Kingdom: Plantae
- Clade: Tracheophytes
- Clade: Angiosperms
- Clade: Monocots
- Order: Asparagales
- Family: Asparagaceae
- Subfamily: Convallarioideae
- Genus: Dracaena
- Species: D. tamaranae

Binomial name
- Dracaena tamaranae Marrero Rodr., R.S.Almeira & M.Gonzáles-Martin

= Dracaena tamaranae =

Species of plant

Dracaena tamaranae, or drago de Gran Canaria, is a species of flowering plant endemic to the island of Gran Canaria, related to the dragon tree, Dracaena draco, and other species of Dracaena from East Africa. Since 1972, specimens of dragon tree have been identified in Gran Canaria with certain peculiarities. These were initially identified as specimens of Dracaena draco. However, a more detailed study concluded that it corresponded to a new species.

== Description ==
This dragon tree has rigid, ribbed leaves that are pointed towards the tip and of a more bluish and grayish color than those of D. draco. Its bearing is less dense and branched, reaching more than 8 meters in height. The bark is grayish-yellow and somewhat shiny. The whitish-green inflorescences are arranged in a branched inflorescence up to 80–100 cm long. The seeds are globose and slightly compressed, about 6–7 mm in diameter.

It shows similarities with species from East Africa, such as Dracaena ombet and Dracaena schizantha, and from Arabia, such as Dracaena serrulata. It is believed that the species could have reached the Canary Islands during the Miocene period.

== Differences with Dracaena draco ==
- Ribbed leaves, more bluish and greyish in color, even in juvenile specimens.
- More branched inflorescence.
- Flowers with different characteristics.
- Smaller fruits and seeds.
- It is most similar to species from East Africa and Arabia, while D. draco has them with the dragon tree from the island of Socotra, in the Indian Ocean.

== Distribution and habitat ==
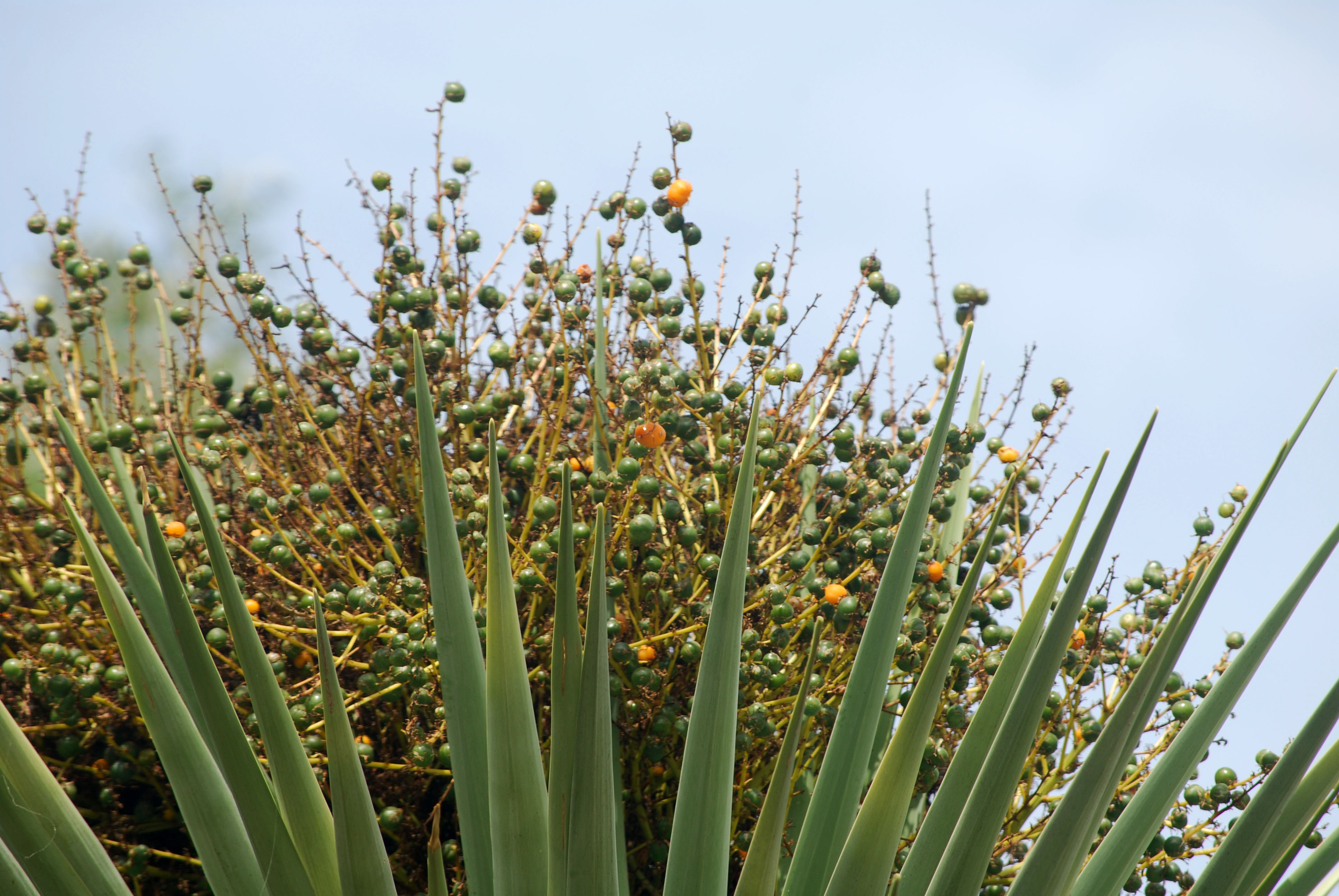
Cluster of fruits of the dragon tree of Gran Canaria (Dracaena tamaranae).

The dragon trees found are in the south of the island of Gran Canaria, in a more xeric zone than usual for Dracaena draco.

The dragon tree of Gran Canaria has been described as typical of the thermo-sclerophilic plant communities of the tropical-subtropical region. They are really xerophilous, inhabiting areas with rainfall of between 200 and 500 mm per year. The specimens found are located in the geologically oldest areas of the island, on generally inaccessible cliffs. These areas are home to remains of their original ecosystems: juniper and jarales. They coexist with species such as junipers, jaguars, wild olive trees, pines, etc.

It is in danger of extinction, is listed in the National Catalog of Threatened Species and needs a recovery plan.

== Culture ==
Due to the scarcity of specimens, its cultivation outside the scientific field is not yet possible. It is recommended, however, not to introduce specimens of D. draco in the area likely to host or be reforested with this species.

== Taxonomy ==
Dracaena tamaranae was described by Marrero Rodr., RSAlmeida & Gonz.-Mart. and published in the Botanical Journal of the Linnean Society 128: 294. 1998.

=== Etymology ===
Ver: Dracaena tamaranae : related to Tamarán, an aboriginal name attributed to Gran Canaria.

== Bibliography ==
- Almeida Pérez, Rafael S. El drago de Gran Canaria (Dracaena tamaranae): The dragon tree of Gran Canaria (Dracaena tamaranae): a botanical jewel of the insular flora recently discovered for science (PDF). La Vinca.
- Almeida Pérez, Rafael S. El drago de Gran Canaria (Dracaena tamaranae): a botanical gem of island flora recently discovered for science (PDF). La Vinca.
- Marrero, Águedo (2004). El Drago de Gran Canaria. Dracaena tamaranae. Magic and Reality. Rincones del Atlántico.
