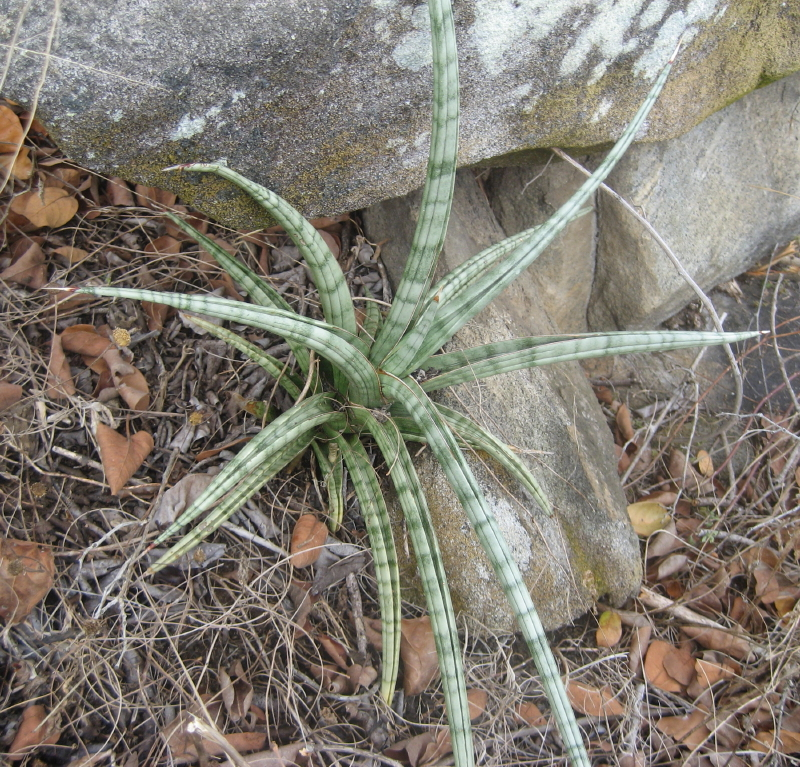
- In habitat

Scientific classification
- Kingdom: Plantae
- Clade: Tracheophytes
- Clade: Angiosperms
- Clade: Monocots
- Order: Asparagales
- Family: Asparagaceae
- Subfamily: Nolinoideae
- Genus: Dracaena
- Species: D. suffruticosa

Binomial name
- Dracaena suffruticosa (N.E.Br.) Byng & Christenh.

Synonyms
- Sansevieria suffruticosa N.E.Br.

= Dracaena suffruticosa =

Species of flowering plant

Dracaena suffruticosa, synonym Sansevieria suffruticosa is a species of Dracaena native to eastern Africa, from Ethiopia to Malawi. The first description of the species was made in 1915 by N. E. Brown.

== Description ==
It forms a short stem and grows its leaves in a rosette or sometimes in two spiraling rows (spiral distichous). Its spine-tipped leaves are 12-16mm thick, elliptical (rather than round) in cross-section, and pale to dark green depending on sun exposure.

It very closely resembles the smaller related species, Dracaena serpenta and the more distichous species Dracaena phillipsiae. In its native habitat it often grows in dry or rocky ground, and is highly drought tolerant.
