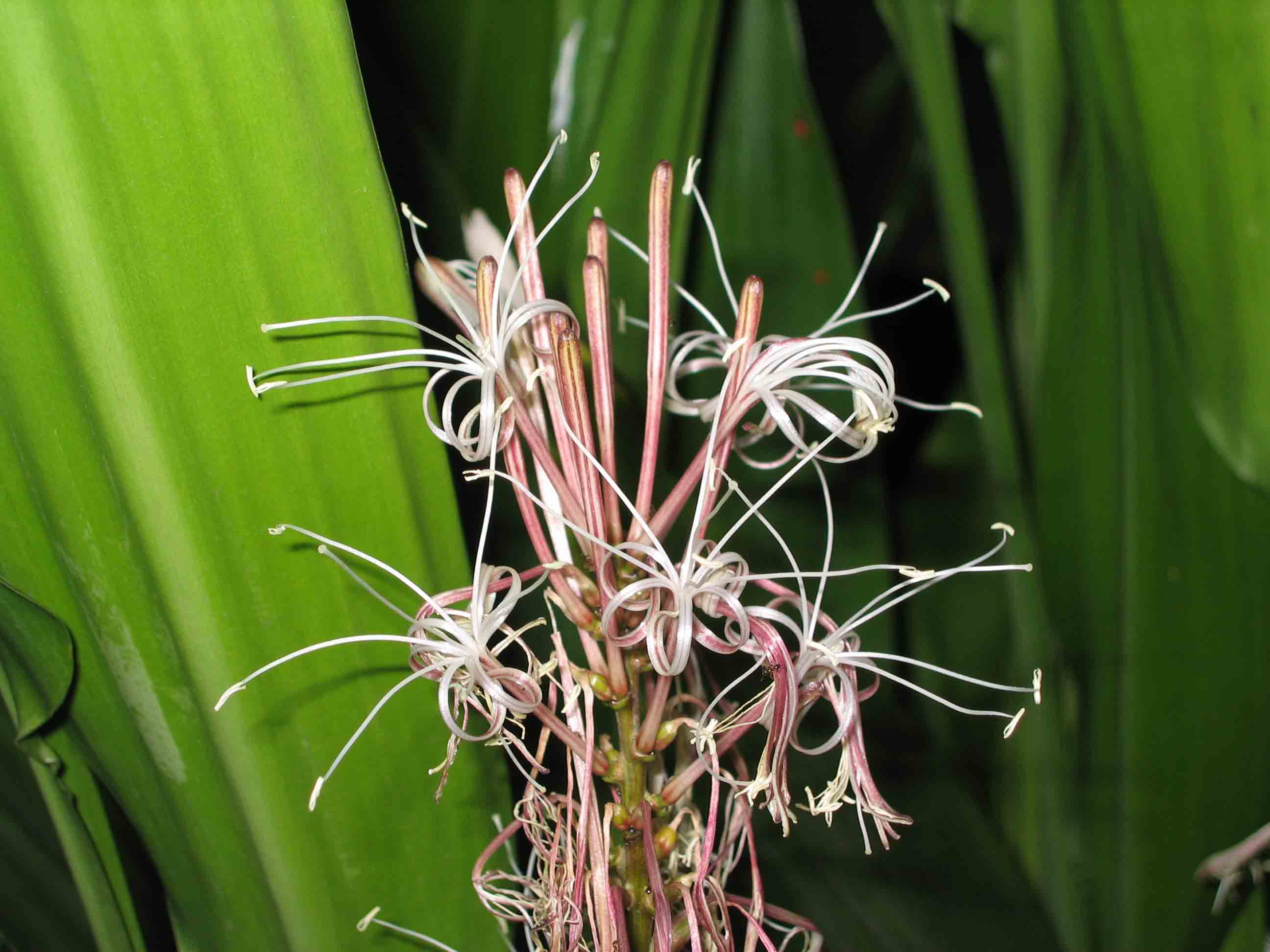
- Inflorescence
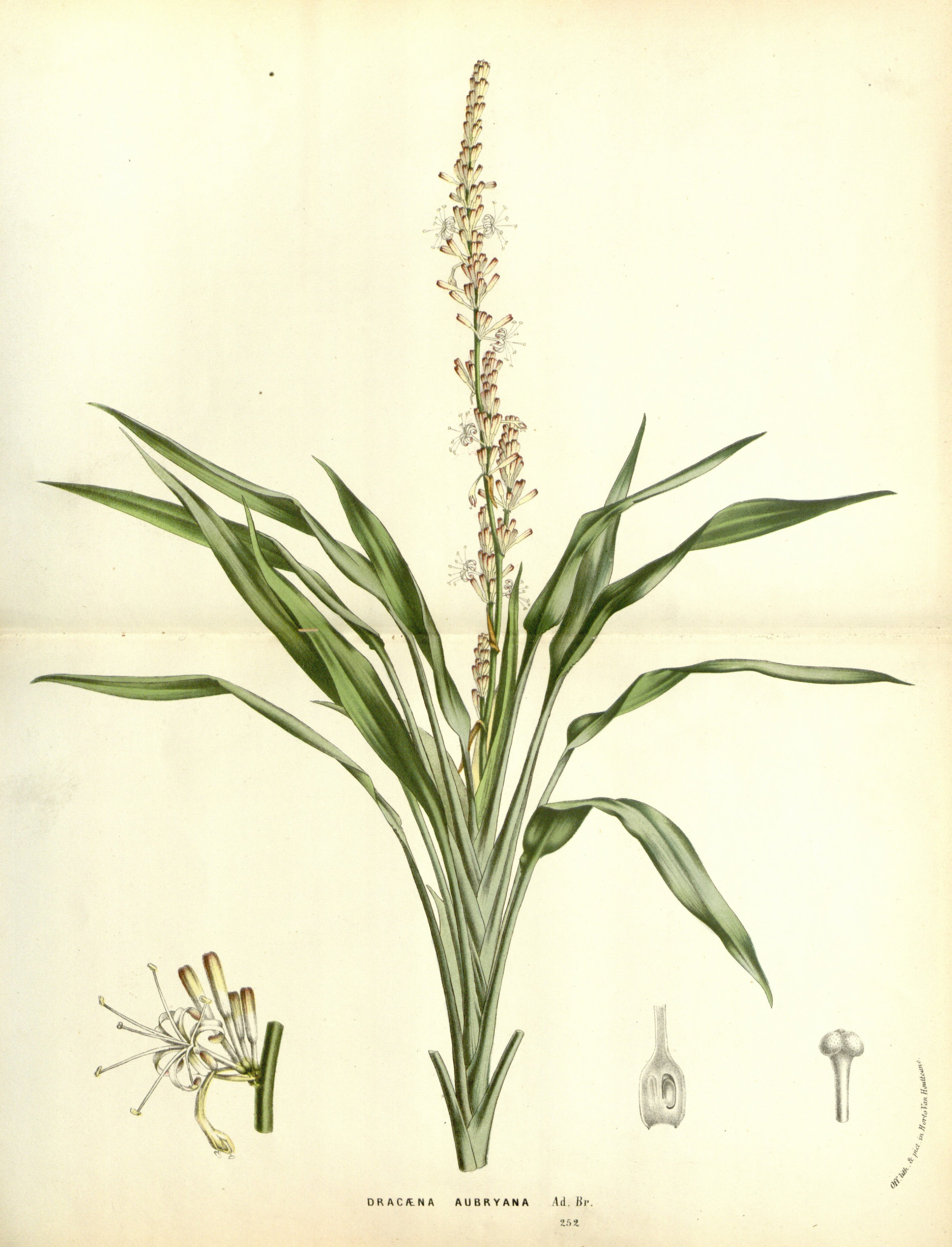
- Botanical illustration

Scientific classification
- Kingdom: Plantae
- Clade: Tracheophytes
- Clade: Angiosperms
- Clade: Monocots
- Order: Asparagales
- Family: Asparagaceae
- Subfamily: Convallarioideae
- Genus: Dracaena
- Species: D. aubryana

Binomial name
- Dracaena aubryana Brongn.

Synonyms
- List: Dracaena humilis Baker; Dracaena monostachya Baker; Dracaena thalioides Jacob-Makoy ex Regel; Draco humilis (Baker) Kuntze; Draco thaliodes (Jacob-Makoy ex Regel) Kuntze; Pleomele humilis (Baker) N.E.Br.; Pleomele monostachya (Baker) N.E.Br.; Pleomele thalioides (Jacob-Makoy ex Regel) N.E.Br.

= Dracaena aubryana =

Species of plant

Dracaena aubryana, the lance dracaena, is a species of flowering plant in the family Asparagaceae. It is native to west-central Tropical Africa, and it has been introduced to Hawaii. An erect shrub reaching 0.5 to 2.5 m (2 to 8 ft), it is found in the seasonally dry tropics. It is occasionally kept as an ornamental.

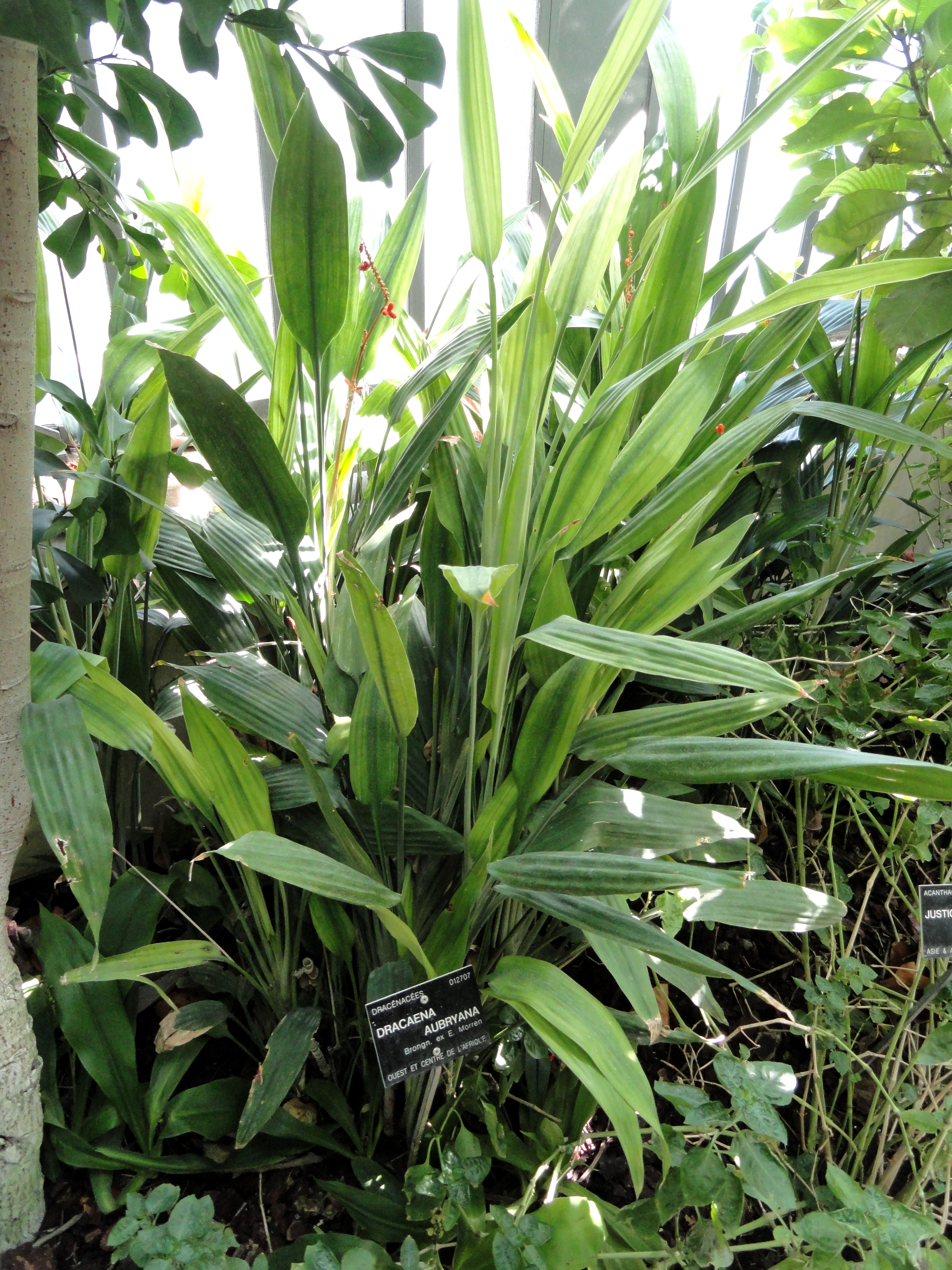
At the Jardin botanique de Lyon

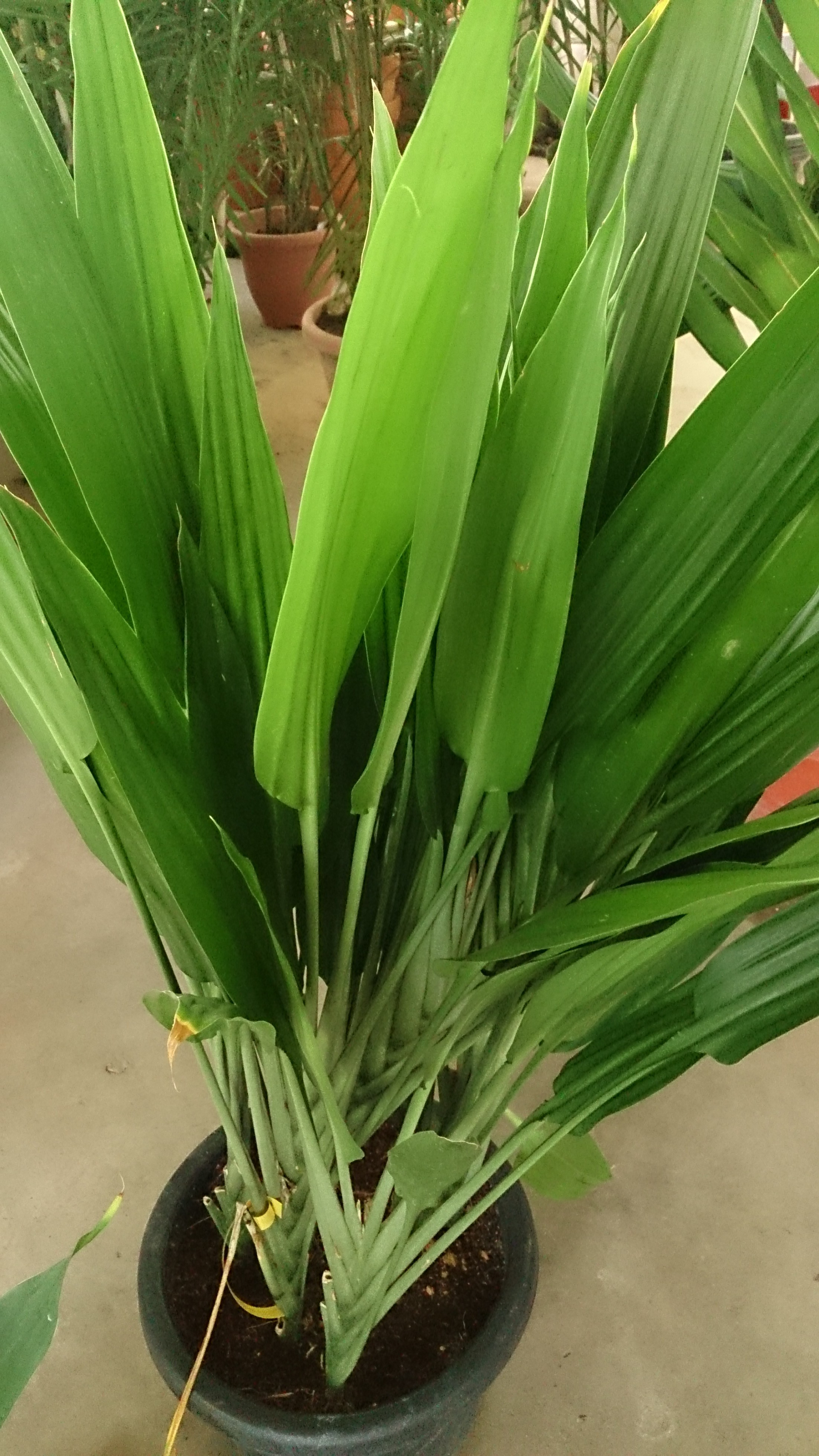
Potted specimen
