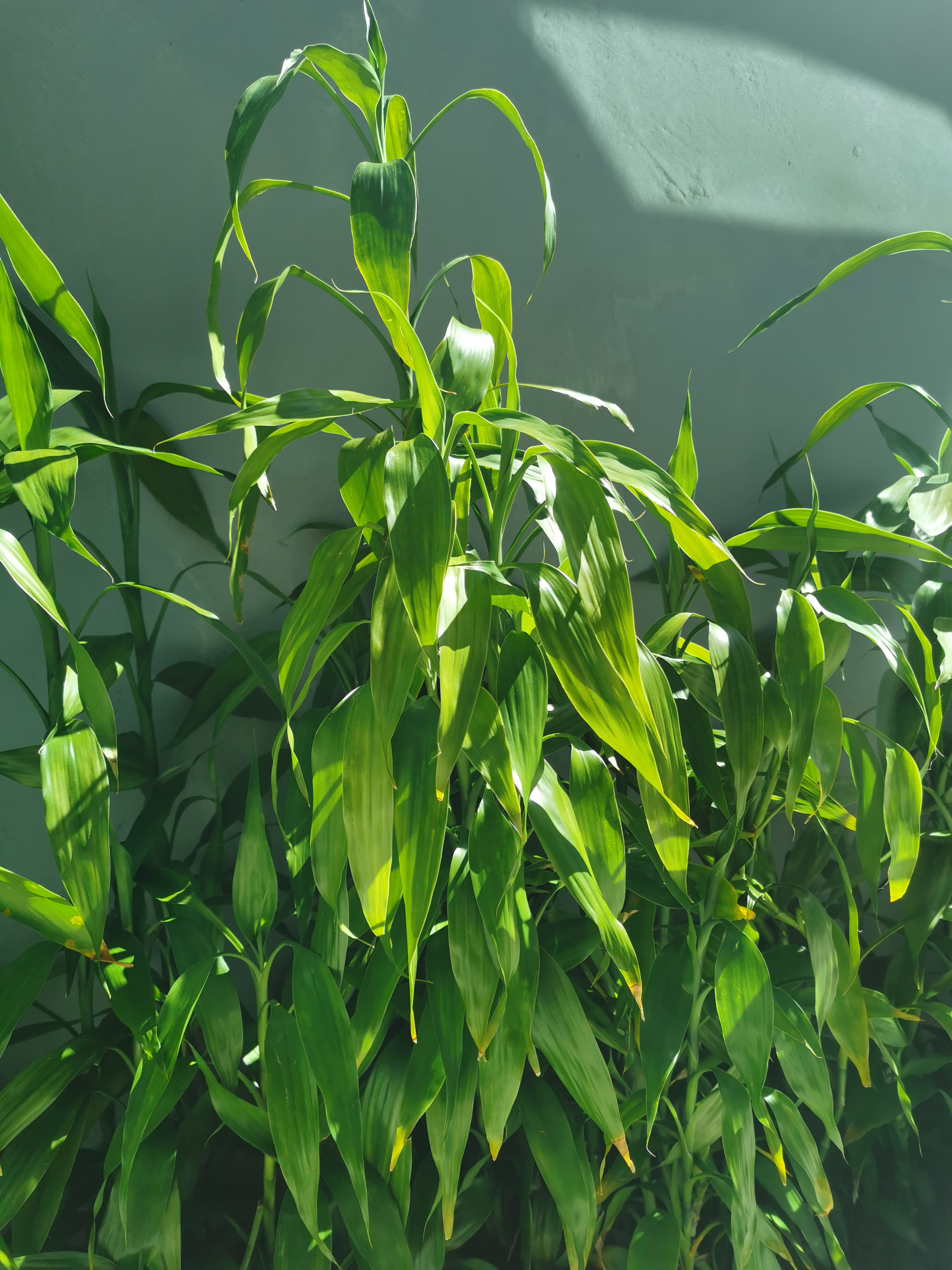
- In cultivation

Scientific classification
- Kingdom: Plantae
- Clade: Tracheophytes
- Clade: Angiosperms
- Clade: Monocots
- Order: Asparagales
- Family: Asparagaceae
- Subfamily: Convallarioideae
- Genus: Dracaena
- Species: D. sanderiana

Binomial name
- Dracaena sanderiana Mast.

Synonyms
- Pleomele sanderiana (Mast.) N.E.Br.; Dracaena poggei Engl.; Dracaena vanderystii De Wild.; Pleomele poggei (Engl.) N.E.Br.

= Dracaena sanderiana =

Lucky bamboo

Species of flowering plant

Dracaena sanderiana is a species of flowering plant in the family Asparagaceae, native to Central Africa. It was named after the German–English gardener Henry Frederick Conrad Sander (1847–1920). The plant is commonly marketed as "lucky bamboo," which has become one of its common names, although it is not a species of bamboo.

== Names ==
Common names include Sander's dracaena, ribbon dracaena, lucky bamboo, curly bamboo, Chinese water bamboo, Goddess of Mercy's plant, Belgian evergreen. It is also called the ribbon plant, although the same common name is sometimes used for Chlorophytum comosum (also known as the spider plant). While the word bamboo occurs in several of this plant's common names, D. sanderiana is of an entirely different taxonomic order from true bamboos – though this plant and true bamboos both fall under the monocot clade. Despite several of its common names that suggest it is from China or Belgium, it is a native West African species. Dracaena sanderiana is also often confused with Dracaena braunii, a plant from coastal West Africa with flowers 5 times shorter than those of D. sanderiana.

== Description ==
A perennial herb reaching a height of 100 cm (39 in), the plant has slightly twisted, gray-green leaves which grow to around 23 cm (9 in). Its fleshy stem distinguishes it from bamboo. Over time, the plant's stem becomes unsteady with the added weight of new growth. Regular trimmings are needed to ensure the shape of this plant stays neat and manageable while it grows.

== Cultivation ==
Dracaena sanderiana and its related varieties are popular houseplants. It is a suitable plant for confined spaces, and it does very well in indirect sunlight or partial shade as direct sunlight often causes its leaves to burn or yellow. The ideal temperature range for D. sanderiana is from 16 to 27 °C (61 to 81 °F). It requires average warmth, adequate light, and regular watering with dry periods in between if planted in soil. It tolerates dry air, but because it is a tropical plant, it does best in higher humidity areas or when given regular mistings. When planted indoors, it stays a smaller, more compact size while growing upwards, leading to its bamboo-like appearance. In contrast, if planted in the ground, it loses its bamboo-like look and it would fill with a leaf-like shape like other dragon trees. When it comes to light, lucky bamboo prefers bright, filtered sunlight, such as what is found under a rainforest canopy. Avoid direct sunlight as it will scorch the leaves. It can be propagated by cutting a part of the stem just above a node (the "rings" around the plant's stem from which offshoots grow). Cuttings can be made year round.

== Gallery ==
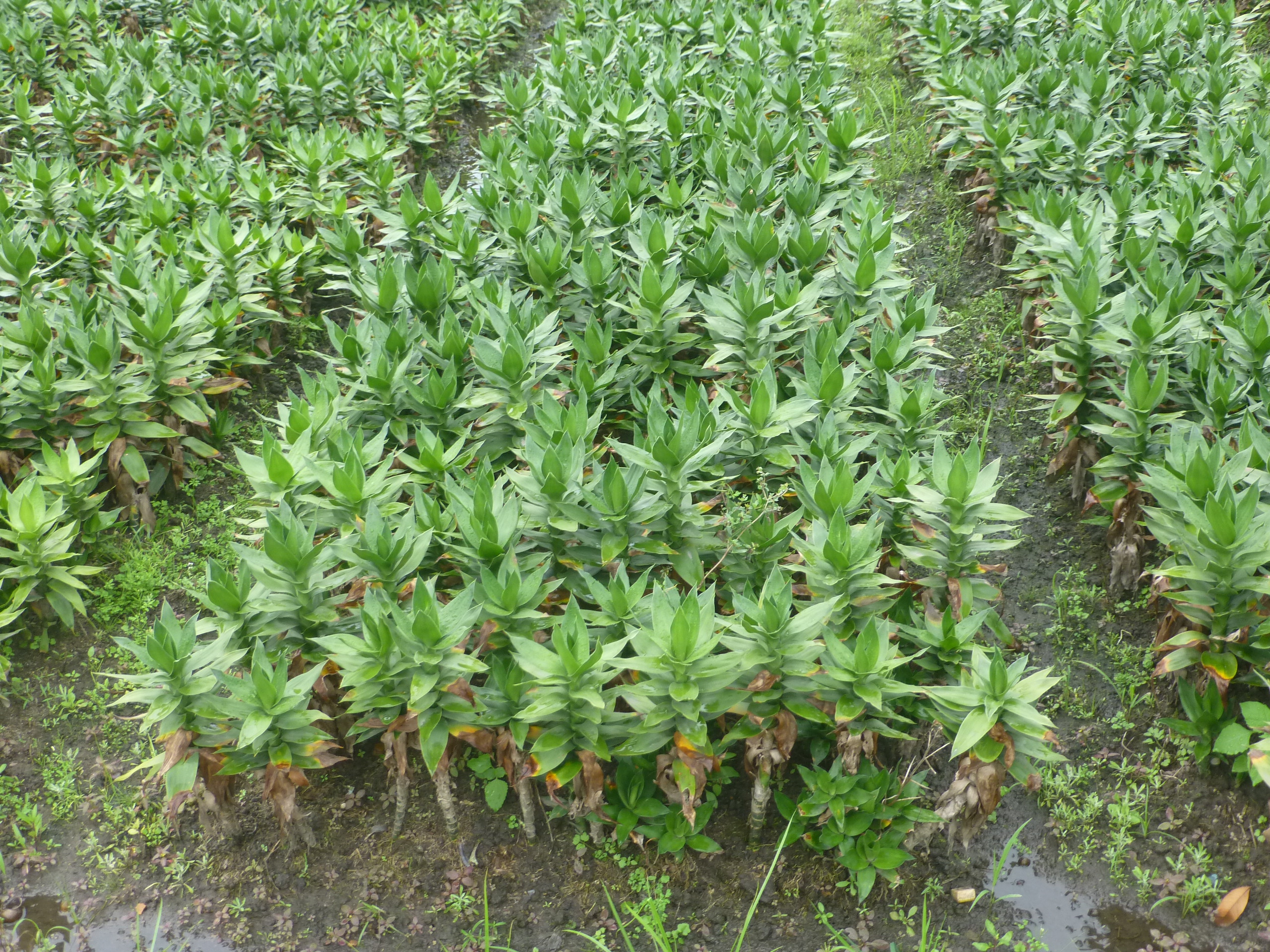
A field of lucky bamboo in Donghai Island, Guangdong

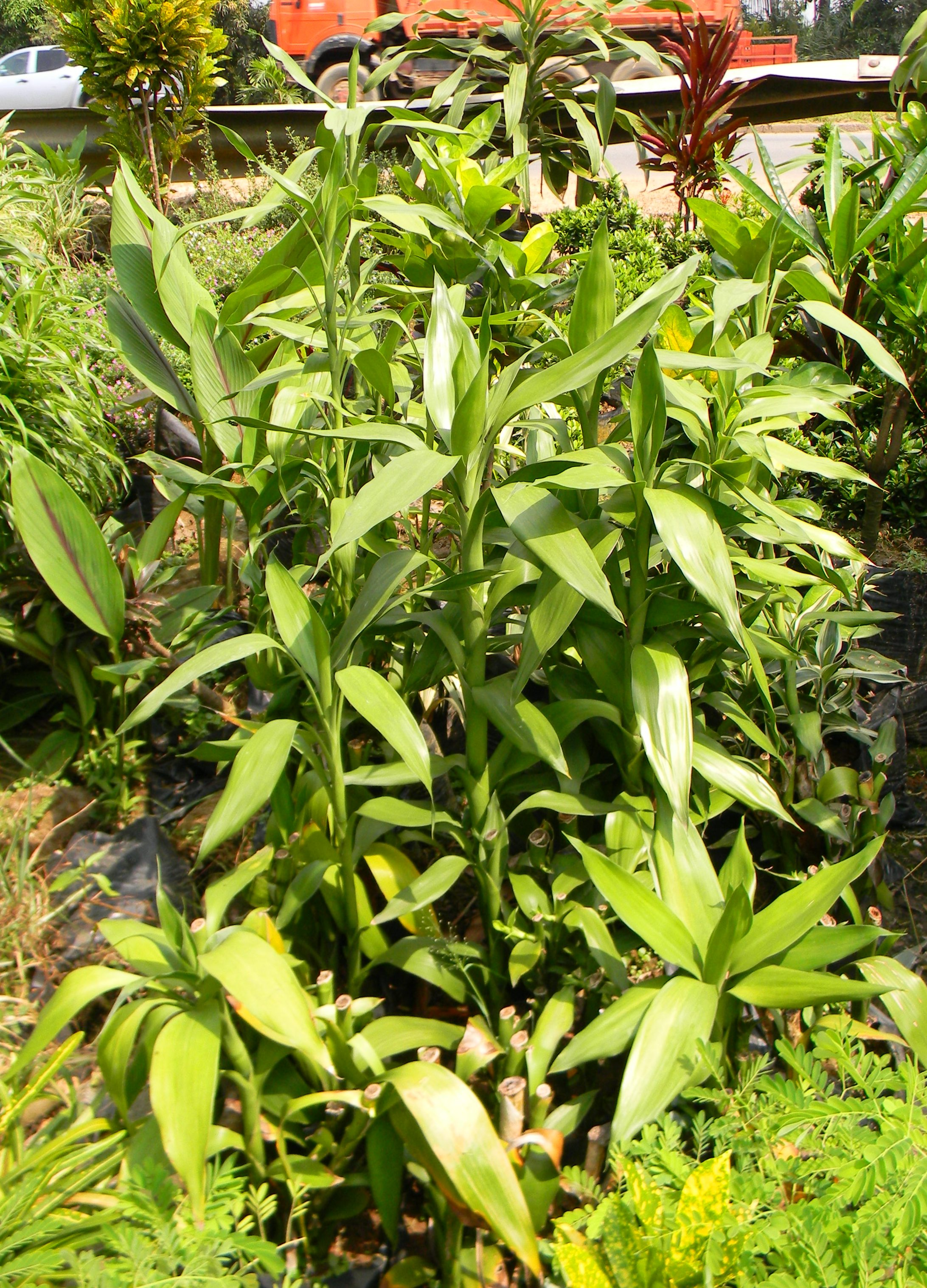
In Libreville, Gabon

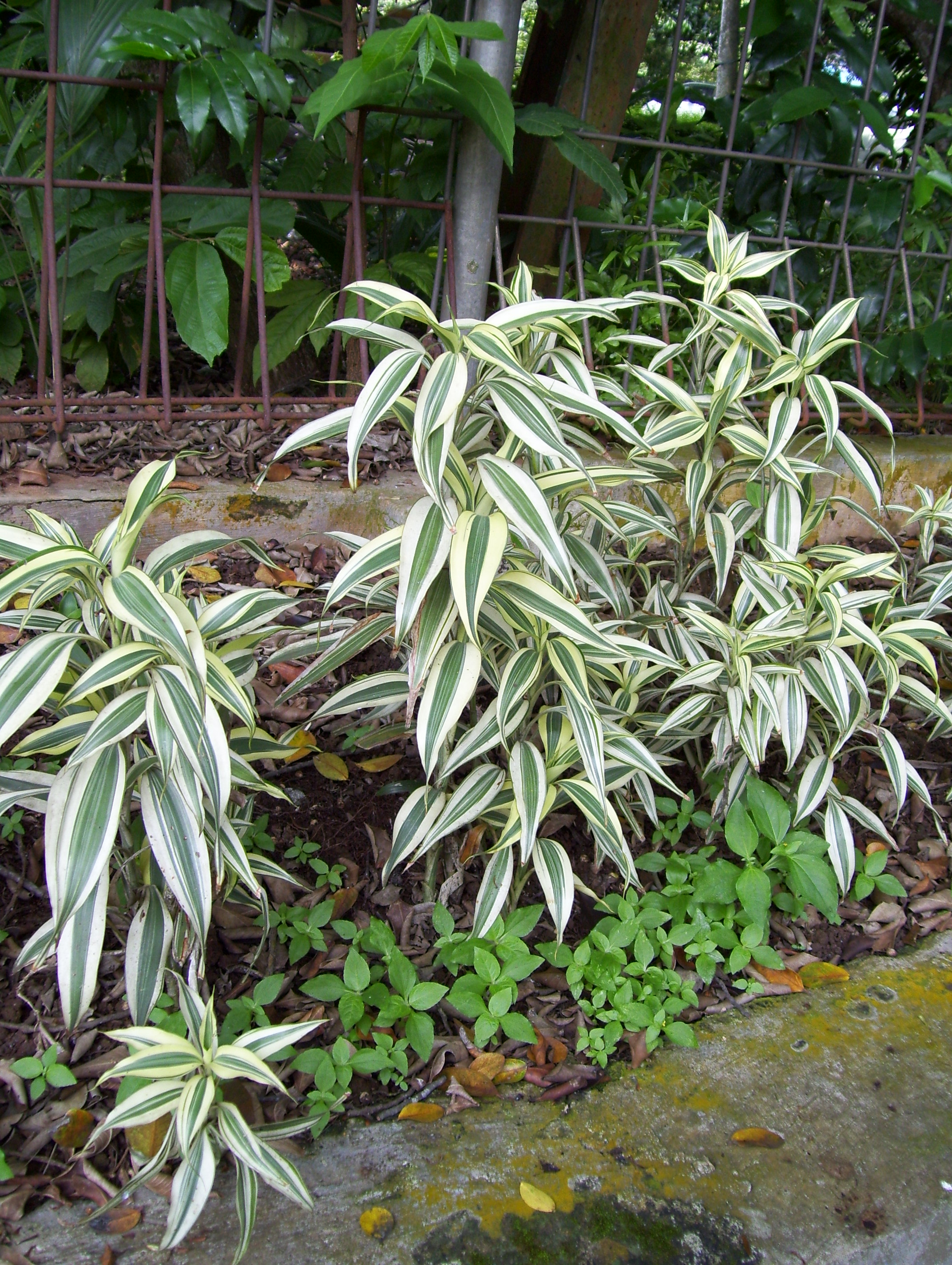
Variegated-leaved plants

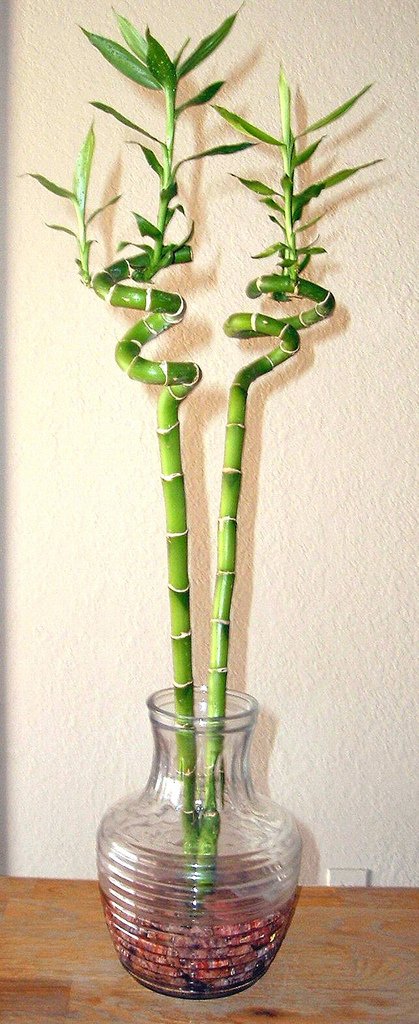
Lucky bamboo spiral houseplant

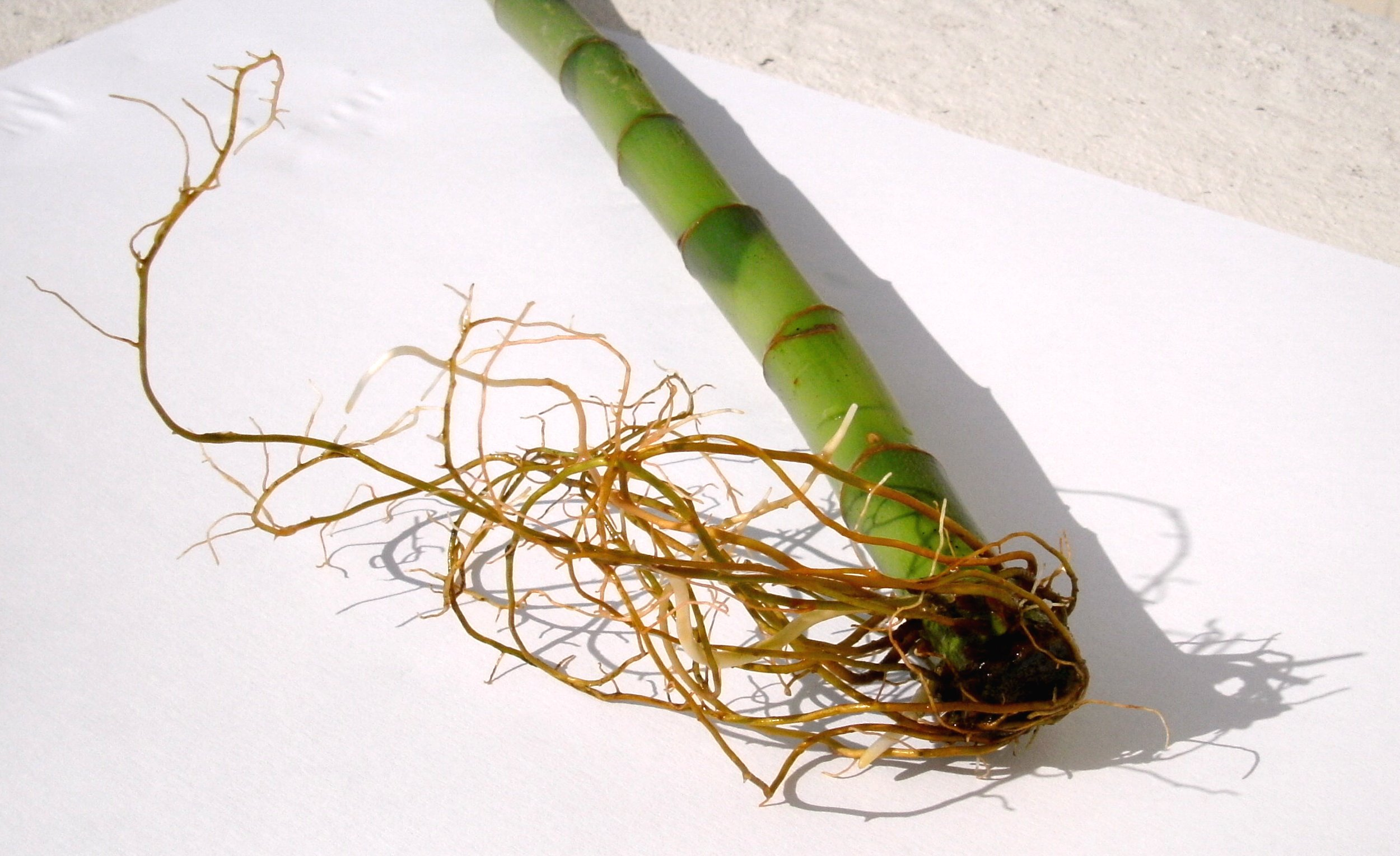
Adventitious roots

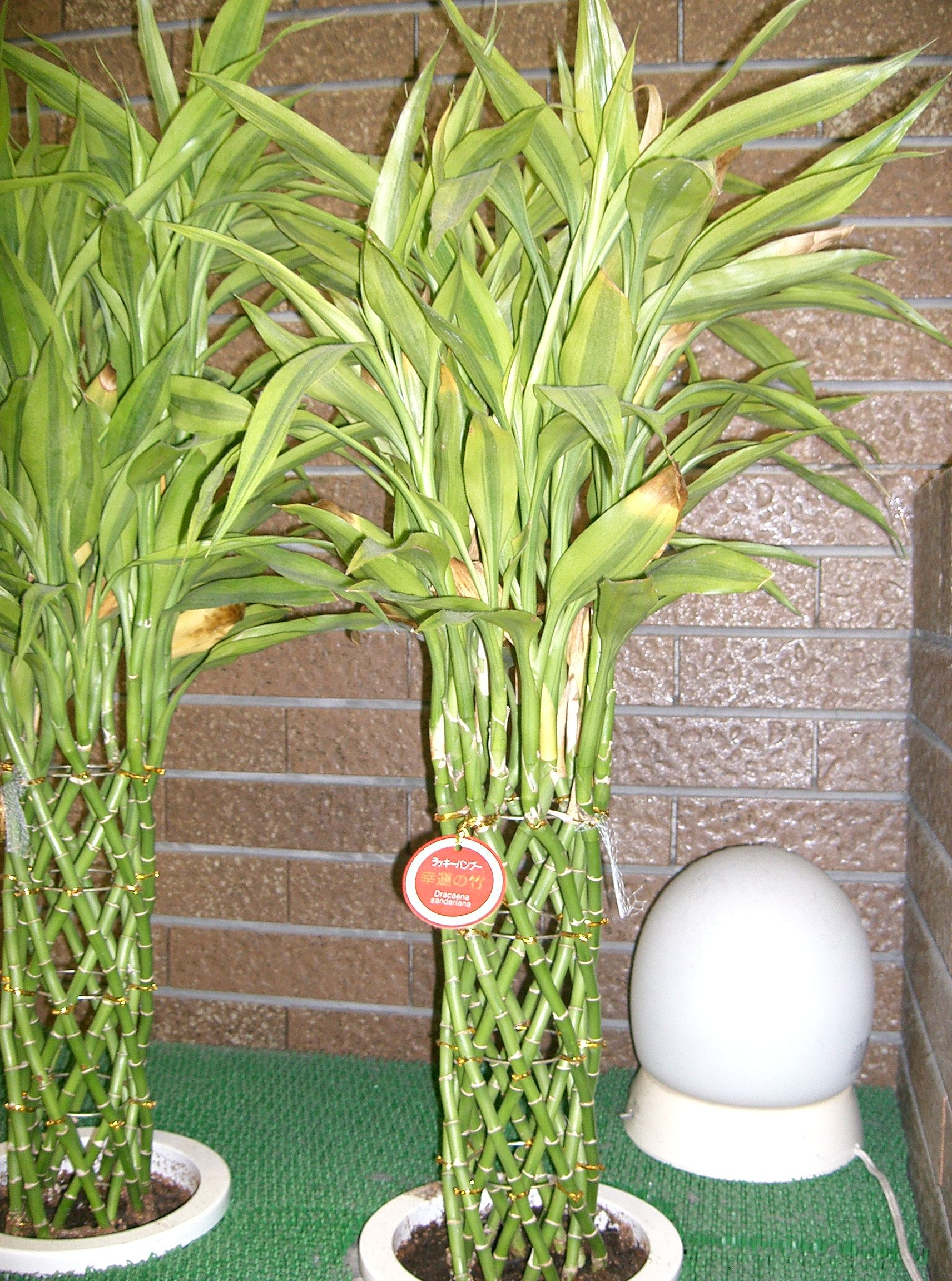
Variegated-leaved plants with multiple, woven stems.

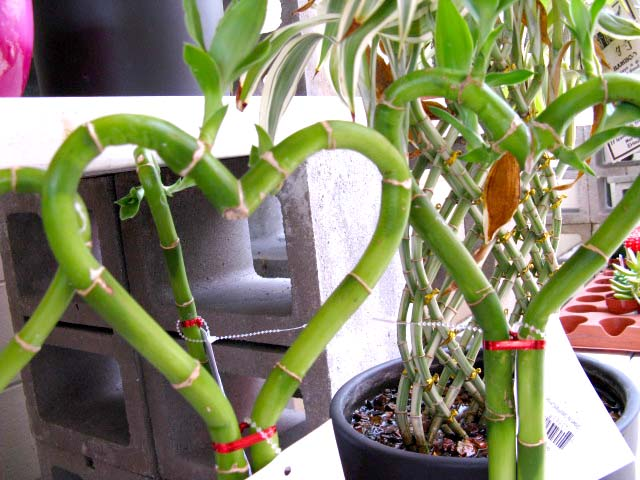
With heart-shaped stems.

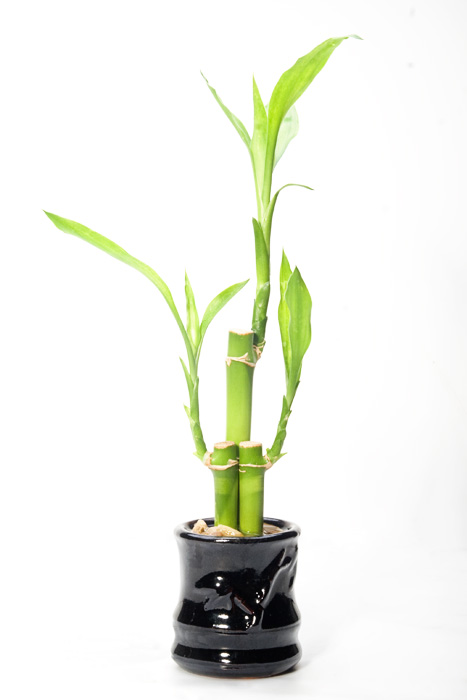
A trio of Dracaena sanderiana

== See also ==
- Media related to Dracaena sanderiana at Wikimedia Commons
- Data related to Dracaena sanderiana at Wikispecies
