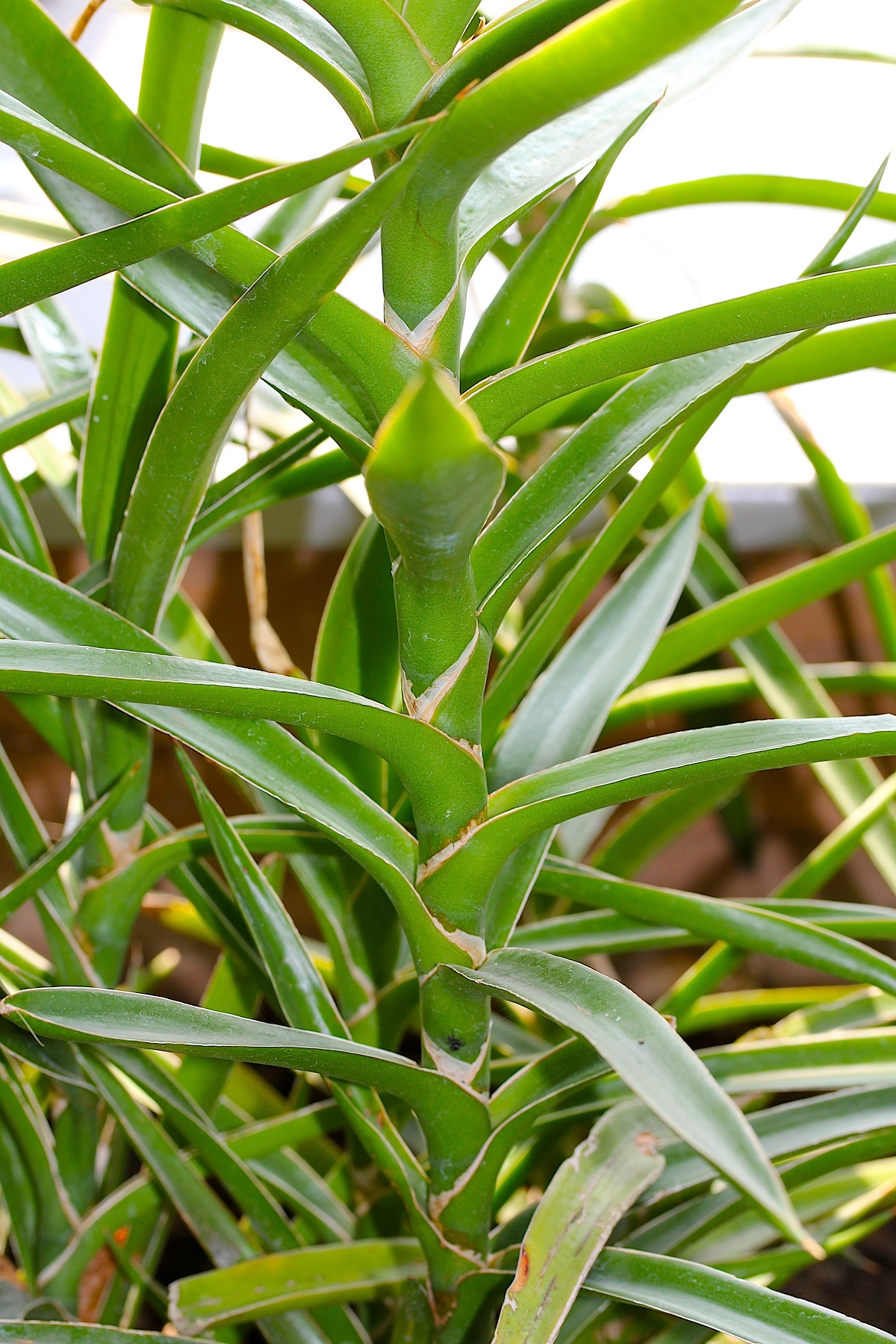

Scientific classification
- Kingdom: Plantae
- Clade: Embryophytes
- Clade: Tracheophytes
- Clade: Angiosperms
- Clade: Monocots
- Order: Asparagales
- Family: Asparagaceae
- Subfamily: Convallarioideae
- Genus: Dracaena
- Species: D. bagamoyensis

Binomial name
- Dracaena bagamoyensis (N.E.Br.) Byng & Christenh.

Synonyms
- Sansevieria bagamoyensis N.E.Br.

= Dracaena bagamoyensis =

Species of flowering plant

Dracaena bagamoyensis, synonym Sansevieria bagamoyensis, also known as snake plant, is a succulent plant native to Kenya and Tanzania.

== Description ==
Dracaena bagamoyensis grows long stems (over 60 centimetres (2.0 ft)), with slender, flat, succulent leaves.

It very closely resembles the related Dracaena arborescens, which has wider, more pliable leaves. The leaves of D. bagamoyensis are narrower (under 16 millimetres (0.63 in)) and more brittle.
