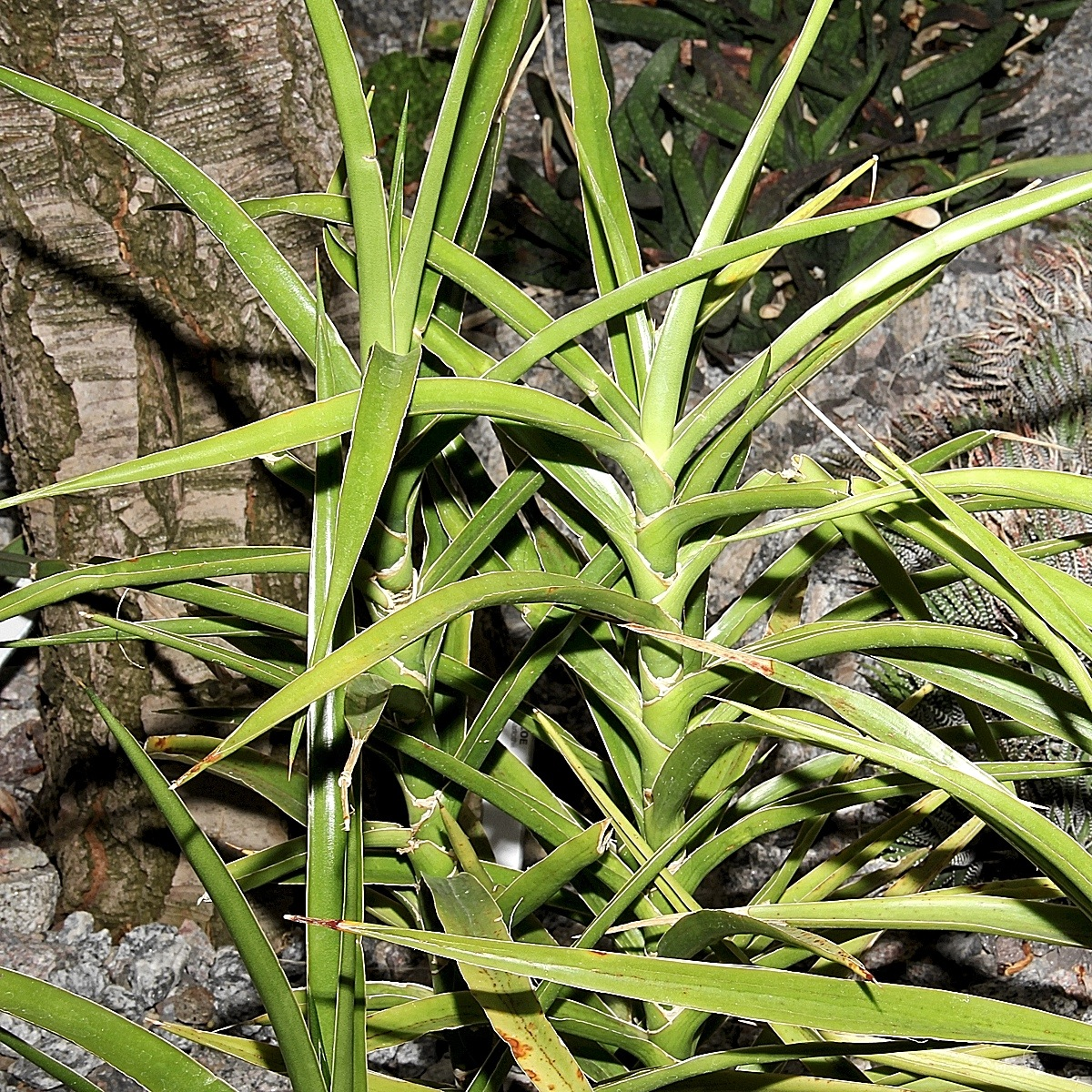
- D. arborescens has thick, flexible leaves on long stems

Scientific classification
- Kingdom: Plantae
- Clade: Tracheophytes
- Clade: Angiosperms
- Clade: Monocots
- Order: Asparagales
- Family: Asparagaceae
- Subfamily: Nolinoideae
- Genus: Dracaena
- Species: D. arborescens

Binomial name
- Dracaena arborescens (Cornu ex Gérôme & Labroy) Byng & Christenh.

Synonyms
- Sansevieria arborescens Cornu ex Gérôme & Labroy

= Dracaena arborescens =

Species of flowering plant

Dracaena arborescens, synonym Sansevieria arborescens, is a succulent plant native to Kenya and Tanzania.

== Description ==
Dracaena arborescens grows long stems over 60 centimetres (2.0 ft) tall, with thick, flat, succulent leaves. Its name refers to the tree-like height of the stems.

It very closely resembles the related Dracaena bagamoyensis. However, the leaves of D. arborescens are wider (over 25 mm) and less brittle.
