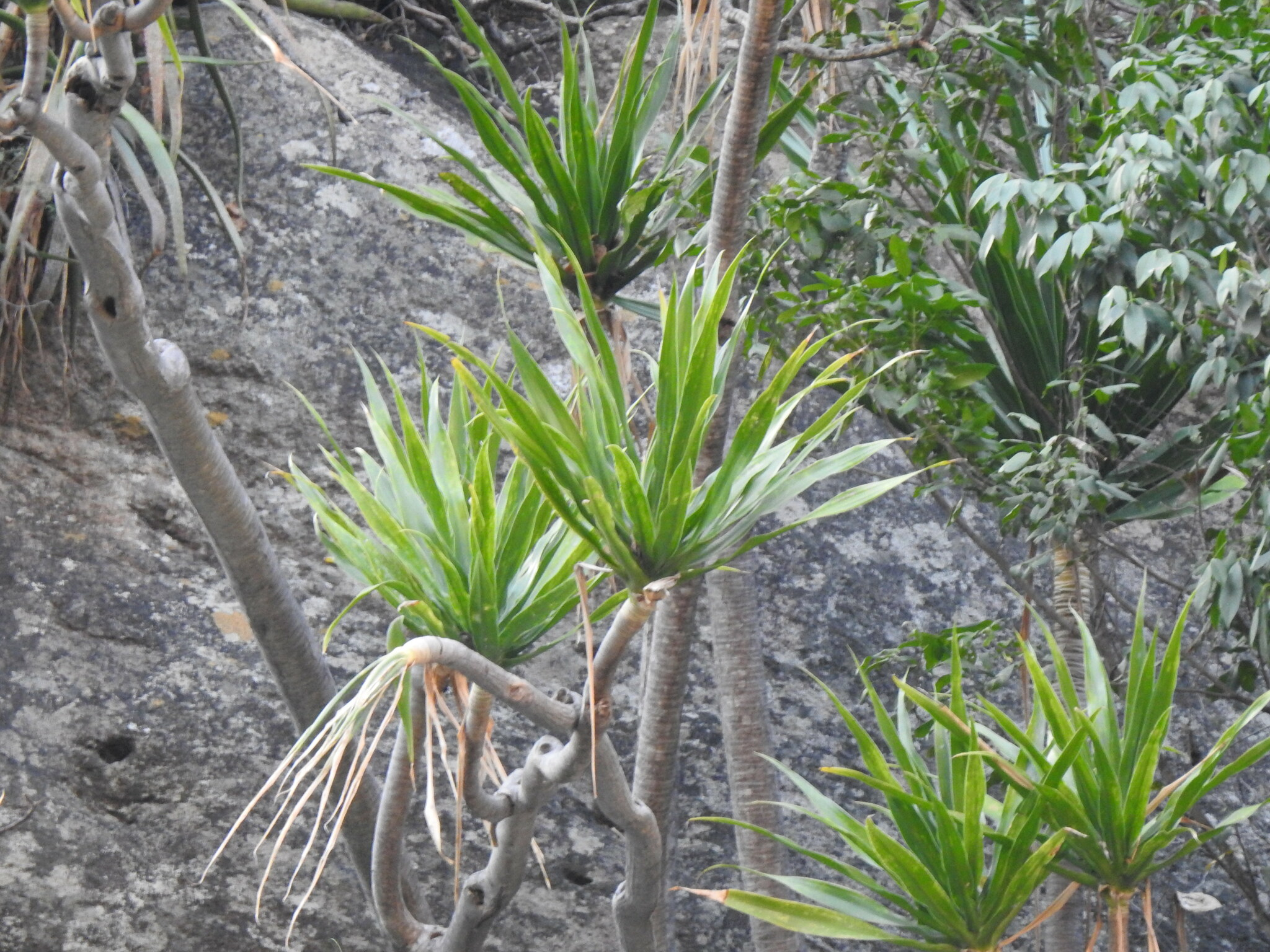

Scientific classification
- Kingdom: Plantae
- Clade: Embryophytes
- Clade: Tracheophytes
- Clade: Angiosperms
- Clade: Monocots
- Order: Asparagales
- Family: Asparagaceae
- Subfamily: Convallarioideae
- Genus: Dracaena
- Species: D. transvaalensis

Binomial name
- Dracaena transvaalensis Baker

= Dracaena transvaalensis =

Species of plant

Dracaena transvaalensis, the Wolkberg dragon tree, is a medium-sized tree in the genus Dracaena found in the Olifants River Valley near Penge in the Limpopo and the adjacent Wolkberg. It looks similar to Aloe. The plant is considered rare.

The tree's national number is 30.10.
