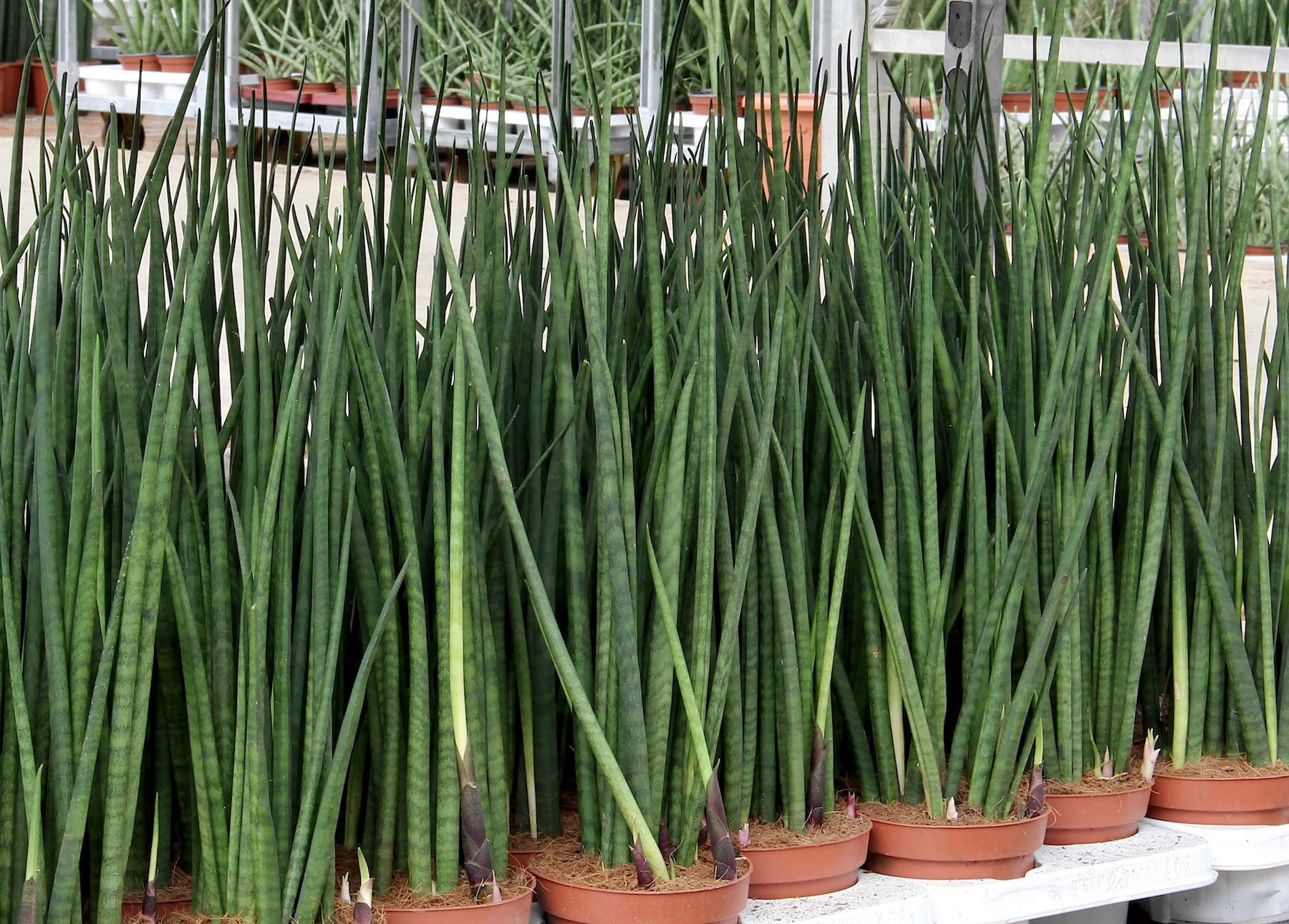
- Mass effect
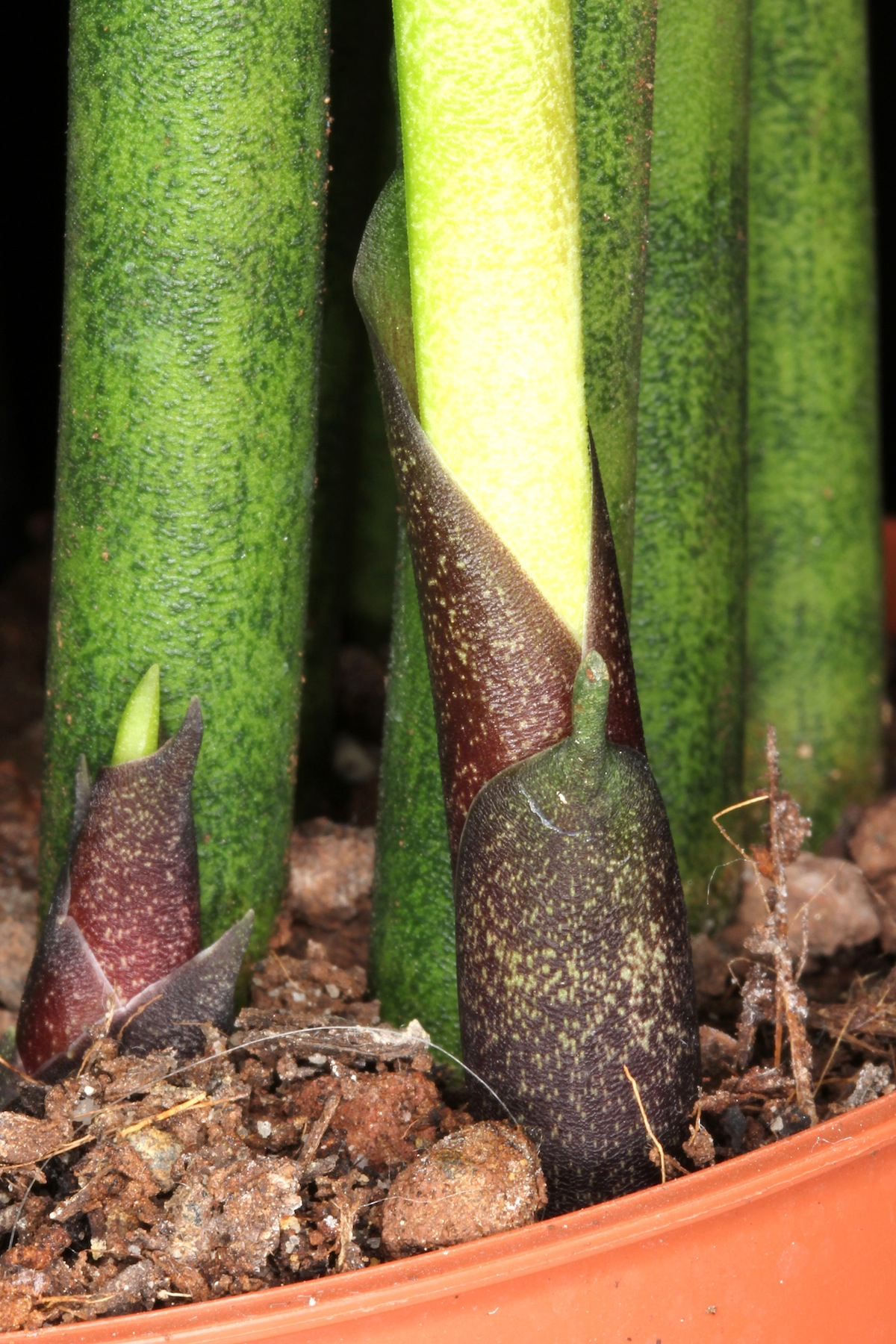
- Purple sheathes

Scientific classification
- Kingdom: Plantae
- Clade: Embryophytes
- Clade: Tracheophytes
- Clade: Spermatophytes
- Clade: Angiosperms
- Clade: Monocots
- Order: Asparagales
- Family: Asparagaceae
- Subfamily: Convallarioideae
- Genus: Dracaena
- Species: D. bacularis

Binomial name
- Dracaena bacularis (Pfennig ex A.Butler & Jankalski) Byng & Christenh.

Synonyms
- Sansevieria bacularis Pfennig ex A.Butler & Jankalski

= Dracaena bacularis =

Species of plant

Dracaena bacularis (many authorities continue to use its synonym Sansevieria bacularis), the rod‑leaved snake plant, is a species of flowering plant in the family Asparagaceae. It is native to the Democratic Republic of the Congo. A rhizomatous geophyte eventually reaching 1.7 m (5 1/2 ft), it can be distinguished from similar members of its genus by its cylindrical leaves, and by the purple sheathes at their bases.
