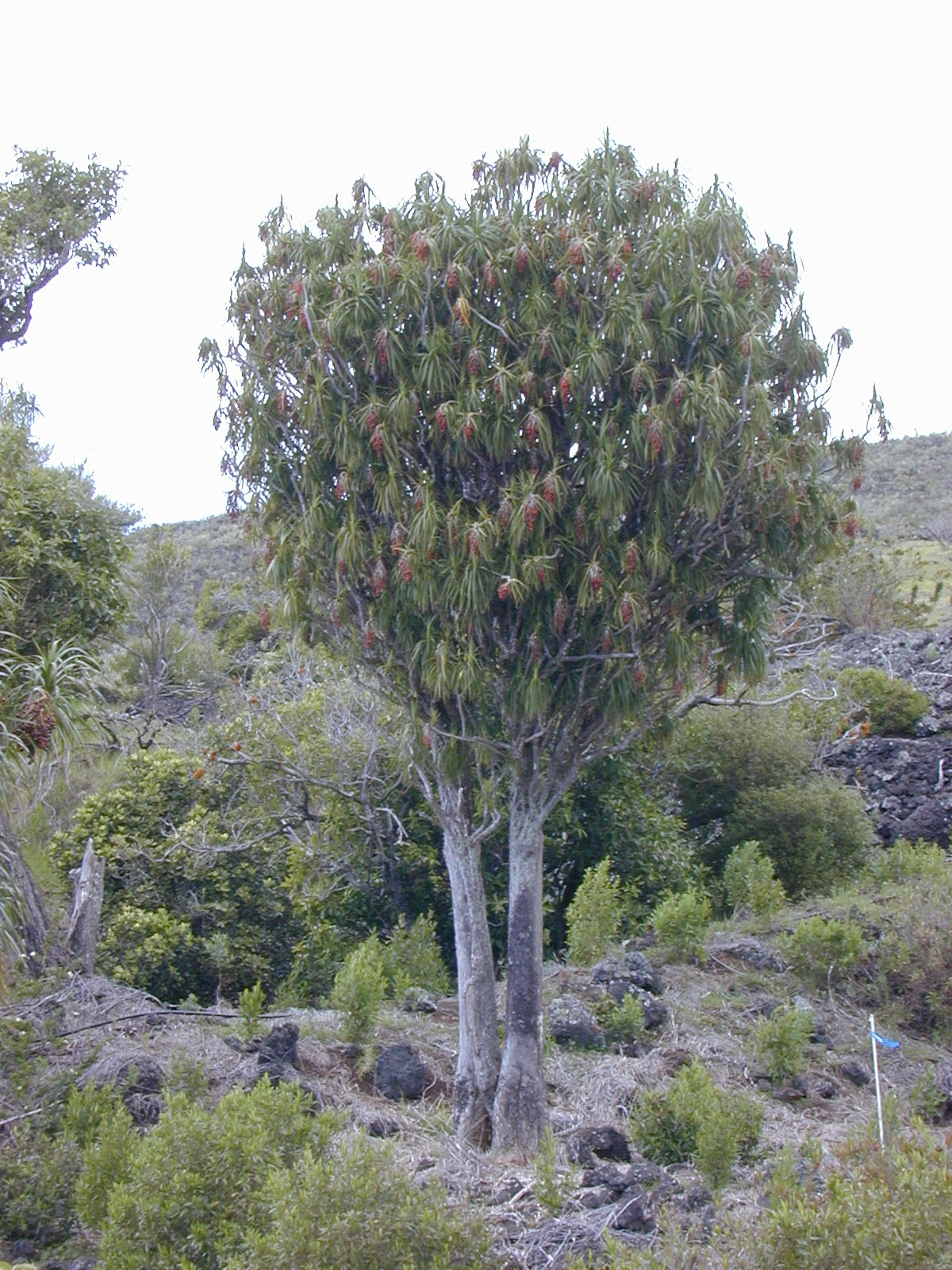

Conservation status
- Vulnerable (IUCN 2.3)

Scientific classification
- Kingdom: Plantae
- Clade: Tracheophytes
- Clade: Angiosperms
- Clade: Monocots
- Order: Asparagales
- Family: Asparagaceae
- Subfamily: Convallarioideae
- Genus: Dracaena
- Species: D. rockii

Binomial name
- Dracaena rockii (H.St.John) Jankalski

Synonyms
- Chrysodracon auwahiensis (H.St.John) P.L.Lu & Morden; Dracaena auwahiensis (H.St.John) Jankalski; Pleomele auwahiensis H.St.John; Pleomele hawaiiensis var. mauiensis O.Deg. & I.Deg.; Pleomele rockii H.St.John

= Dracaena rockii =

Maui hala pepe

Species of tree

Dracaena rockii, synonym Pleomele auwahiensis, commonly known as Maui hala pepe, is a species of flowering plant that is endemic to the islands of Maui and Molokaʻi in Hawaiʻi. It can be found in dry and mesic forests at elevations of 610–1,220 metres (2,000–4,000 ft). It is threatened by habitat loss.
