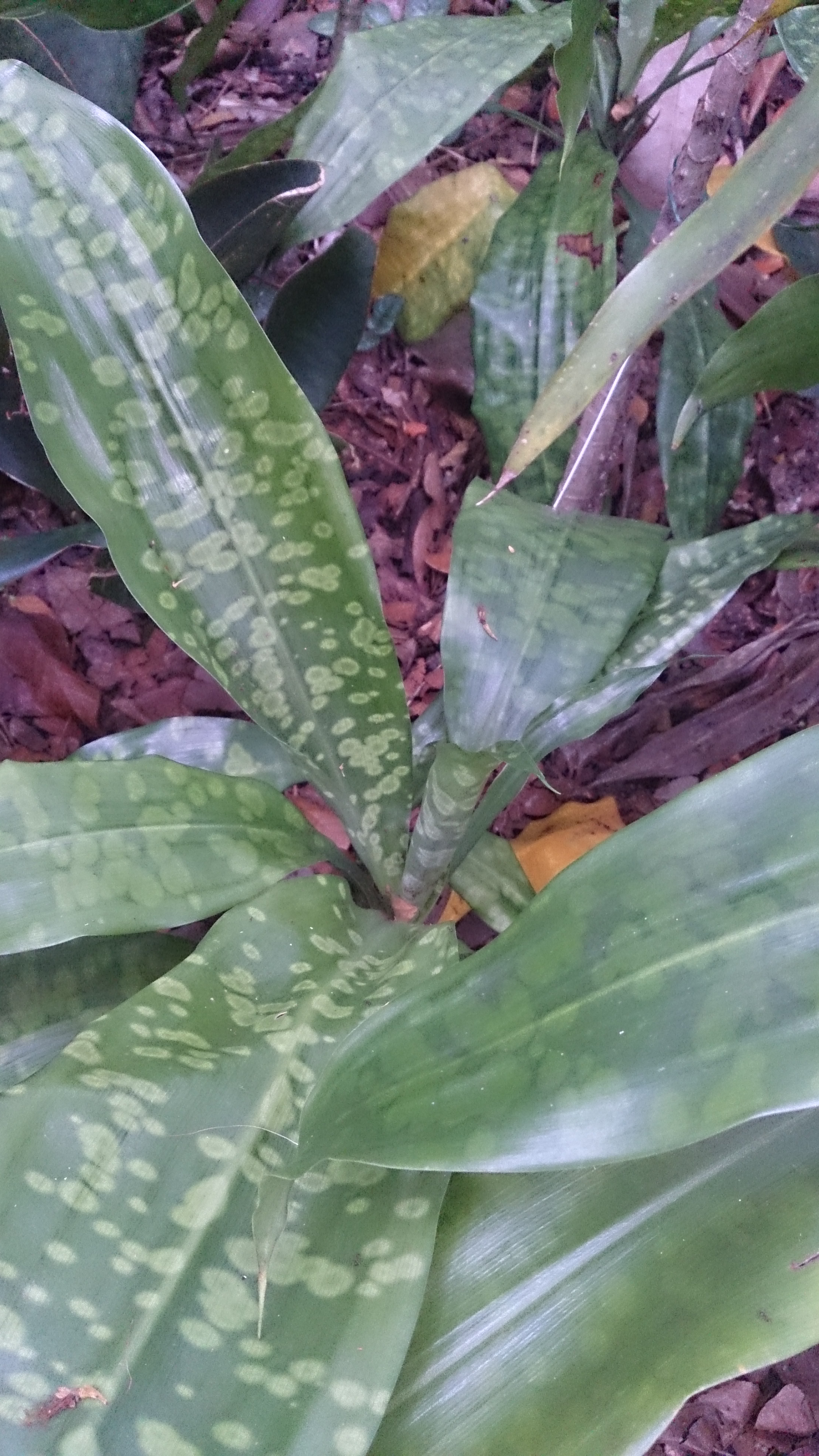

Scientific classification
- Kingdom: Plantae
- Clade: Embryophytes
- Clade: Tracheophytes
- Clade: Angiosperms
- Clade: Monocots
- Order: Asparagales
- Family: Asparagaceae
- Subfamily: Convallarioideae
- Genus: Dracaena
- Species: D. cantleyi

Binomial name
- Dracaena cantleyi Baker

Synonyms
- Dracaena marmorata Baker; Pleomele cantleyi (Baker) N.E.Br.; Pleomele marmorata (Baker) N.E.Br.

= Dracaena cantleyi =

Species of plant

Dracaena cantleyi is a species of flowering plant in the family Asparagaceae. It is native to wet tropical areas of Peninsular Malaysia and Borneo. A small tree reaching 1 to 5 m (3 to 16 ft), it has purplish-green leaves with lighter green mottling. Orangutans (Pongo pygmaeus) have been observed masticating its leaves and using the resultant foam as an anti-inflammatory balm.
