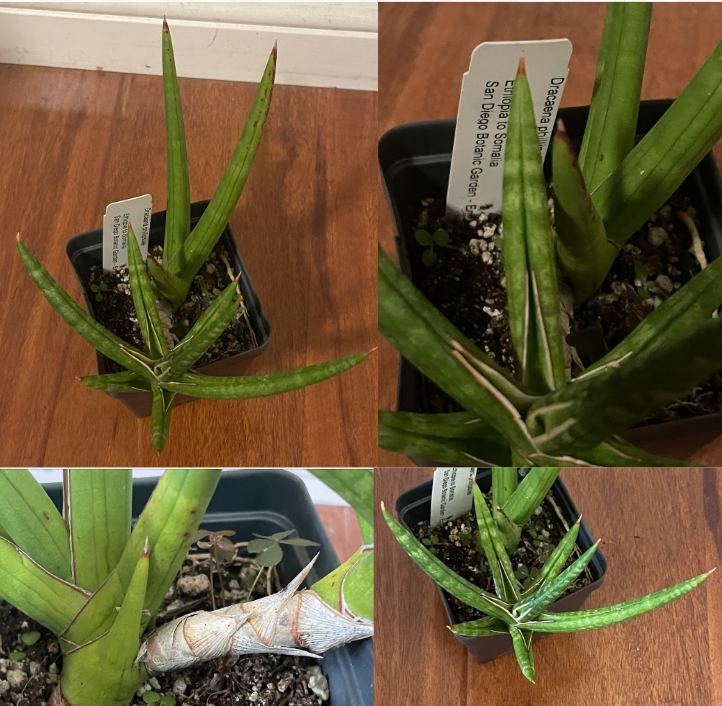

Scientific classification
- Kingdom: Plantae
- Clade: Tracheophytes
- Clade: Angiosperms
- Clade: Monocots
- Order: Asparagales
- Family: Asparagaceae
- Subfamily: Convallarioideae
- Genus: Dracaena
- Species: D. phillipsiae

Binomial name
- Dracaena phillipsiae (N.E.Br.) Byng & Christenh.

Synonyms
- Sansevieria phillipsiae N.E.Br. (1913)

= Dracaena phillipsiae =

Species of plant

Dracaena phillipsiae is a species of plant in the subfamily Convallarioideae native to Ethiopia and Somolia. It was first described in 1913 and reclassified in 2018.

== Description ==
This is a species that has tubular leaves, that can get decently high. Forms small rizhomes, and does not clump rapidly. Can be distinguished from hybrids by the stem.

== Habitat ==
The species occurs in arid African biomes from Ethiopia to Somalia, in desert and dry shrubland.
