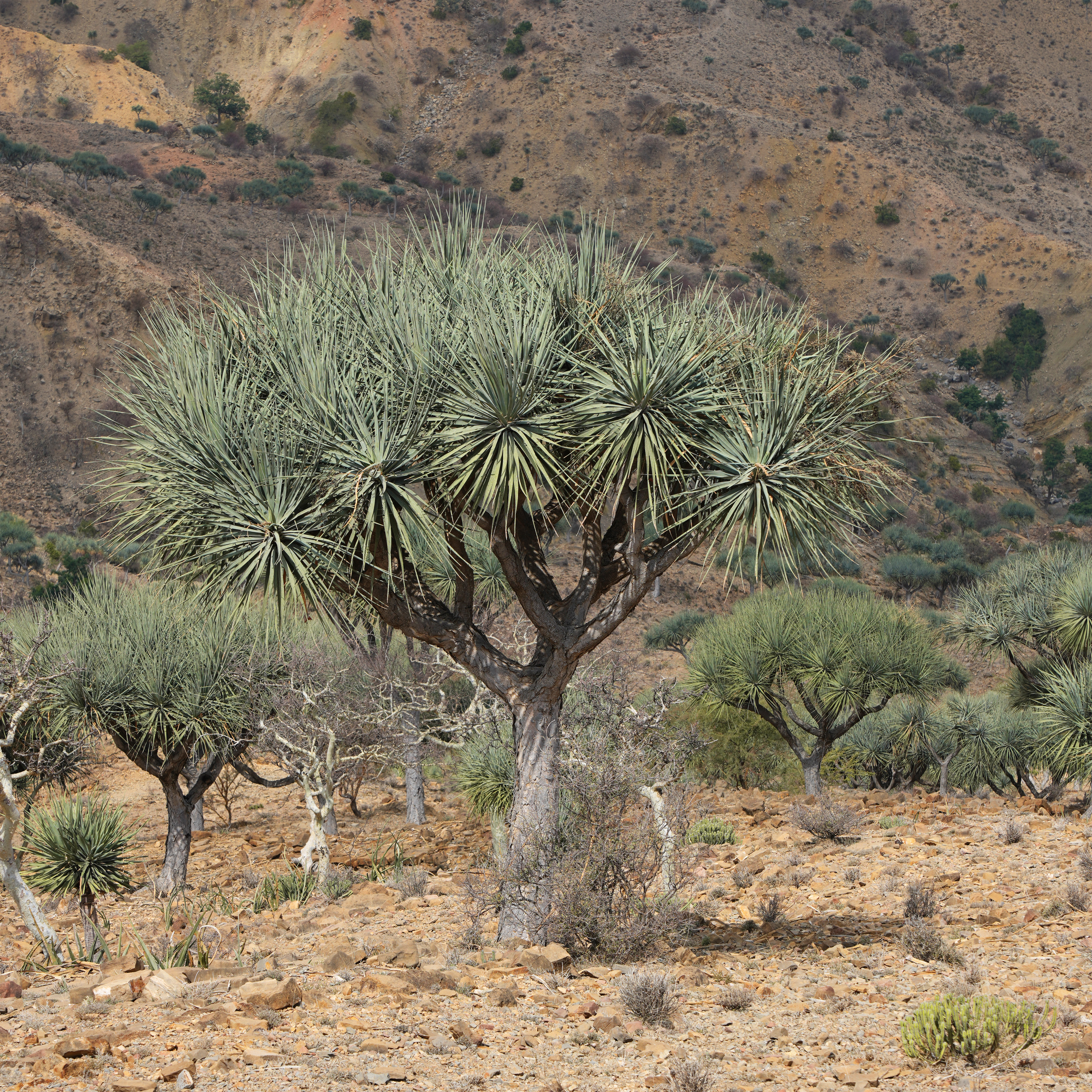

Conservation status
- Endangered (IUCN 2.3)

Scientific classification
- Kingdom: Plantae
- Clade: Tracheophytes
- Clade: Angiosperms
- Clade: Monocots
- Order: Asparagales
- Family: Asparagaceae
- Subfamily: Convallarioideae
- Genus: Dracaena
- Species: D. ombet

Binomial name
- Dracaena ombet Kotschy & Peyr.

Subspecies
- Dracaena ombet subsp. ombet; Dracaena ombet subsp. schizantha (Baker) Bos

Synonyms
- Draco ombet (Heuglin ex Kotschy & Peyr.) Kuntze

= Dracaena ombet =

Species of plant

Dracaena ombet, commonly known as Gabal Elba dragon tree, is a species of plant belonging to the family Asparagaceae, subfamily Convallarioideae, formerly included in the family Ruscaceae. It is found in northeastern Africa and the western Arabian Peninsula.

== Description ==
It is a tree that reaches a size of 2–8 m in height, with a forked trunk that produces a red resin. The leaves form dense rosettes at the ends of the branches, these are linear with a broad base, 40–60 x up to 3 cm, gradually tapering to the tip that is sharp, thick and rigid, with smooth margins, flat to concave in the top. The inflorescence is panicle-shaped, 0.5 m long, highly branched, glabrous or pubescent, with tiny, ovate-lanceolate bracts. Whitish tepals, 4–6 mm long, are linear. Stamens are somewhat shorter than tepals; flattened filaments. The fruit in the form of berries 10–12 mm in diameter.

== Distribution ==
It is found at an altitude of 1000–1800 m in Djibouti, Eritrea, Ethiopia, Somalia, Sudan and Saudi Arabia.

== Taxonomy ==
Dracaena ombet was described by Heuglin ex Kotschy & Peyr. and published in Plantae tinneanae sive descriptio plantarum in ... 47, in 1867.

== Bibliography ==
- BOULOS, L. (1995). Flora of Egypt. Checklist. Al-Hadara Publishing, Cairo. 283 p. [p.]
- BOULOS, L. (2005). FLORA OF EGYPT. [vol. 4] Al Harara Publishing. Cairo. [p. 83]
