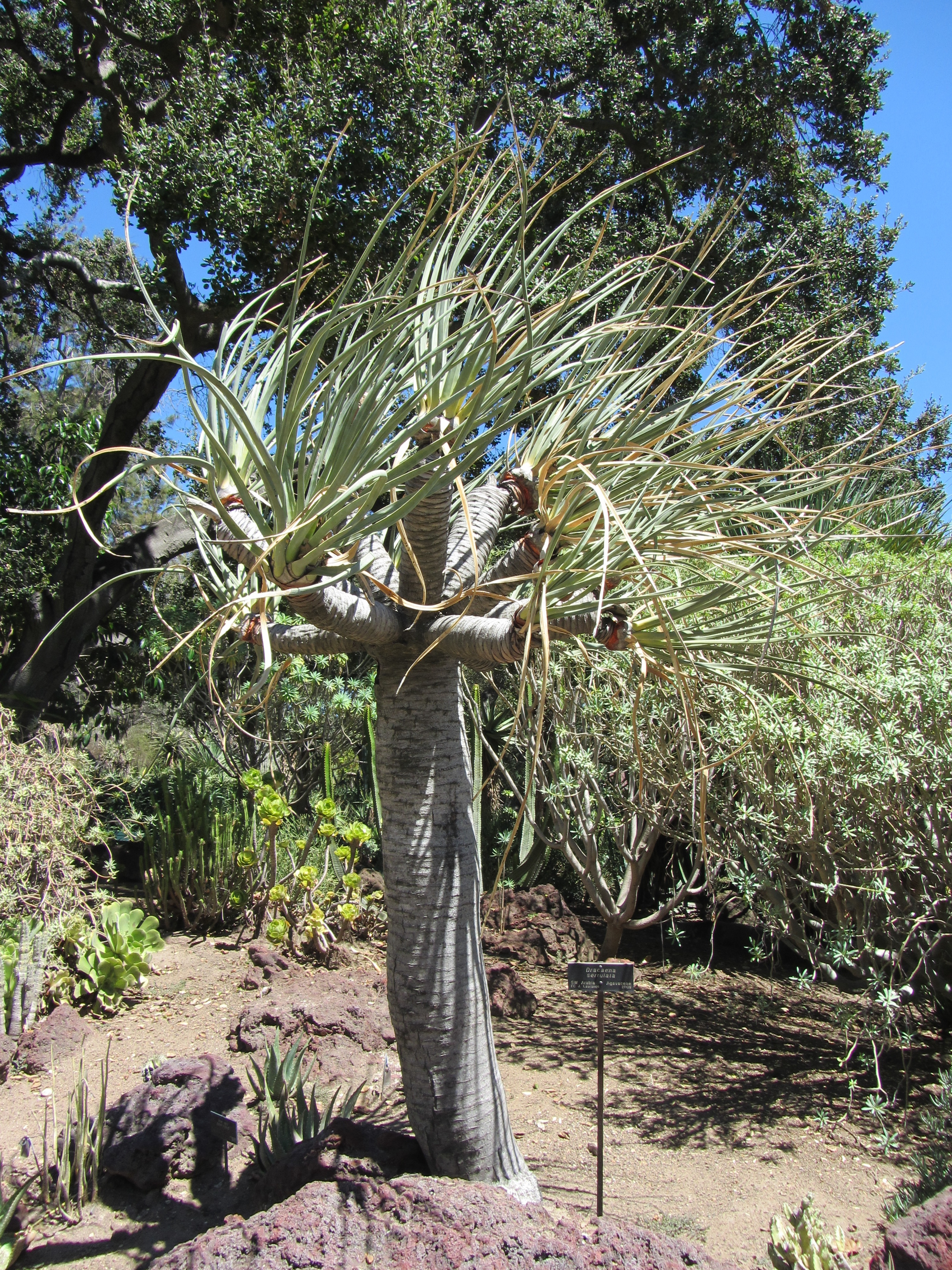

Conservation status
- Endangered (IUCN 2.3)

Scientific classification
- Kingdom: Plantae
- Clade: Tracheophytes
- Clade: Angiosperms
- Clade: Monocots
- Order: Asparagales
- Family: Asparagaceae
- Subfamily: Convallarioideae
- Genus: Dracaena
- Species: D. serrulata

Binomial name
- Dracaena serrulata Baker

= Dracaena serrulata =

Species of flowering plant

Dracaena serrulata, also called the Arabian or Yemen dragon tree, is a distinctive tree reaching around 5m tall with a single trunk. It is found in the dry escarpment mountains of southwestern Arabia in Oman, South Yemen and Saudi Arabia.

== Habitat ==
Dracaena serrulata is restricted largely to the highest, dry plateaus at the back of monsoon mountains, an area which monsoon rains do not reach. Dracaena serrulata grows commonly in association with such species as Vachellia etbaica and Grewia erythraea.

== Uses ==
The stiff leaves of the Dracaena serrulata were an important source of fibre and rope. The large, stiff and spike-tipped leaves were cut or pulled from the trunk, and beaten with heavy clubs to loosen and crack open the rigid outer casing of the leaf. Then the leaves were taken to water and left to soak in it for some weeks. Once thoroughly softened, the leaves were removed from the water and piled up in heaps on a hard, flat surface, and then beaten and thrashed with switches to loosen the fibre into separate strands. Once the separate fibres had been unravelled, they were twisted and rubbed on the thigh or between the fingers to produce threads, which could then be double or trebled, rolled and twisted again, or plaited according to the thickness of rope desired. These threads were traditionally said to make the strongest of all the cordage produced in Oman.

The ropes made from the Dracaena serrulata were popularly used as camel tackle, baggage ropes and rope-pulleys used to lower the heavy sacks of frankincense down precipices or across areas where baggage camels had difficulty penetrating. Ropes from this plant were also used to make harnesses in which men were lowered down sheer cliff sides to gather wild honey.

The threads of the Dracaena serrulata also had a certain 'give', which made them popular for use of sling shots and bow-strings.

The heart of a group of leaves of the Dracaena serrulata could also be eaten.

The wood of the Dracaena serrulata was also occasionally used to make drums. Sections of the trunk would be sliced across horizontally and hollowed out to make the drum, the wooden sides being pierced with small holes and the top and bottom percussive parts being made from leather, usually from goats.

== Conservation ==
Dracaena serrulata is classified as an endangered species. It was awarded the Future Conservation Award in 2017 with plans to identify the population size, health status and reproduction capacity of the species. The project team also plans to detail the distribution and map the extent of the Dracaena serrulata.
