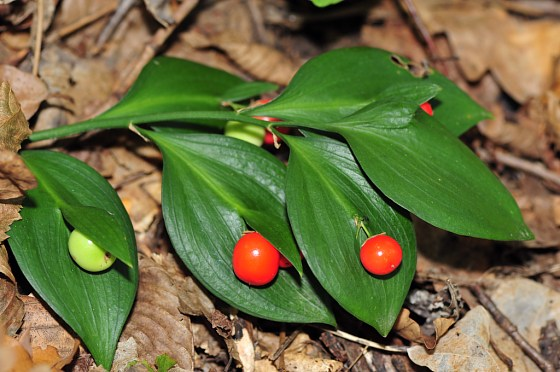

Scientific classification
- Kingdom: Plantae
- Clade: Tracheophytes
- Clade: Angiosperms
- Clade: Monocots
- Order: Asparagales
- Family: Asparagaceae
- Subfamily: Convallarioideae
- Genus: Ruscus
- Species: R. hypoglossum

Binomial name
- Ruscus hypoglossum L.

= Ruscus hypoglossum =

Species of shrub

Ruscus hypoglossum is a small evergreen shrub with a native range from Italy north to Austria and Slovakia and east to Turkey and Crimea. Common names include spineless butcher's-broom, mouse thorn and horse tongue lily. The species name comes from two Greek words ὑπό (hypo) and γλῶσσα (glōssa) meaning under and tongue.

== Description ==
The mature plant shrub will eventually reach about 46 cm (18 in) in height. It has a creeping rootstock and leaf-like phylloclades or flattened stems that are about 8 cm (3 in) long to 4 cm (1 1/2 in) wide tapering at both ends. True leaves are smaller green appendages around the flowers. Small yellow flowers bloom in the axil of a leaf-like bract 2.5–3.8 cm (1–1.5 in) long on upper side of phylloclade. Plants are dioecious, with male and female flowers produced on separate plants. Fruit is a rarely produced red globose berry 0.6 to 1.3 cm (0.25 to 0.5 in) wide.

== Gallery ==
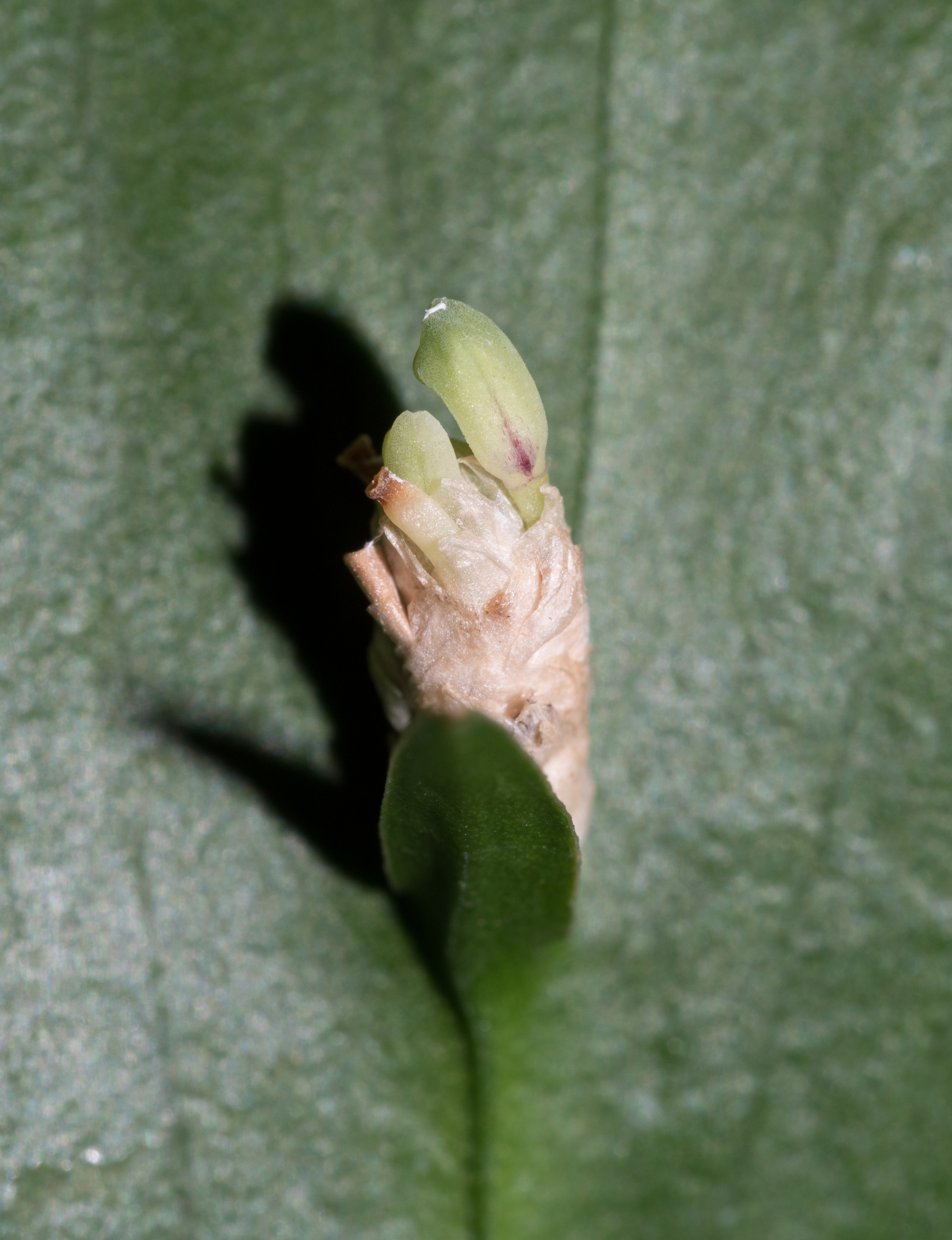
True leaf and flower on the phylloclade.

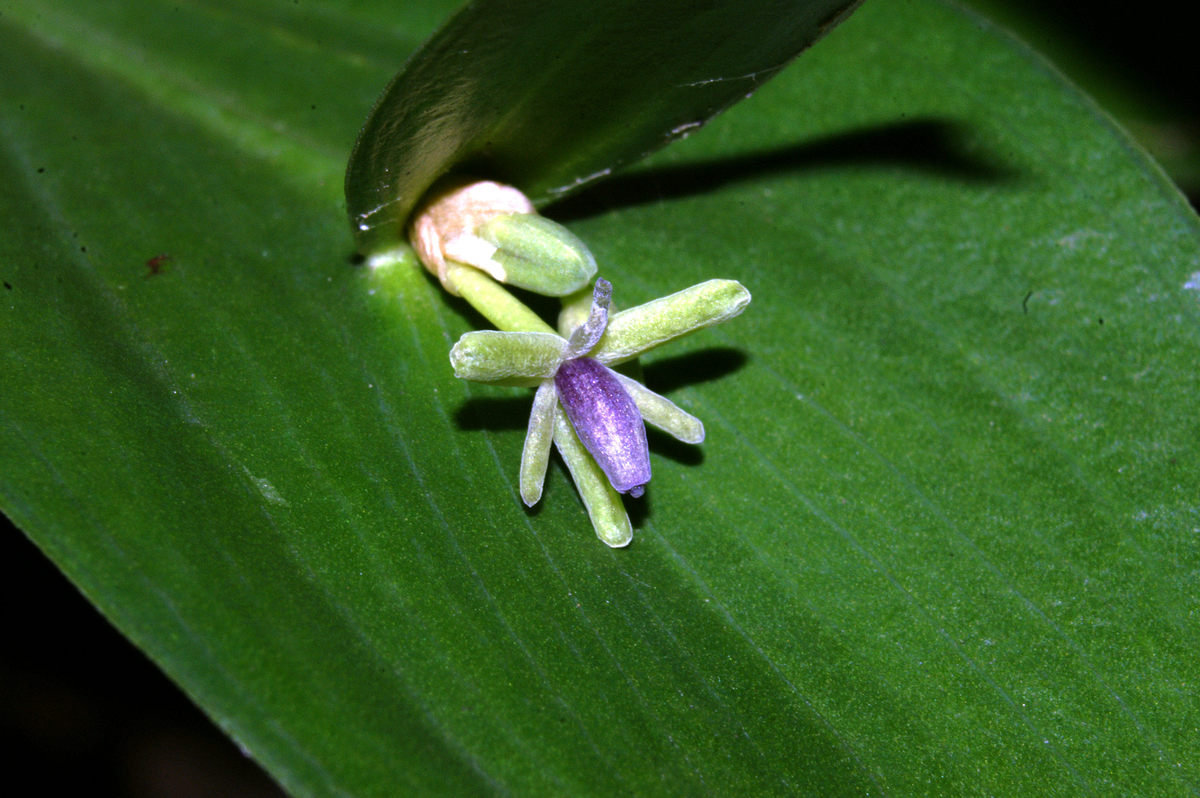
Flower.

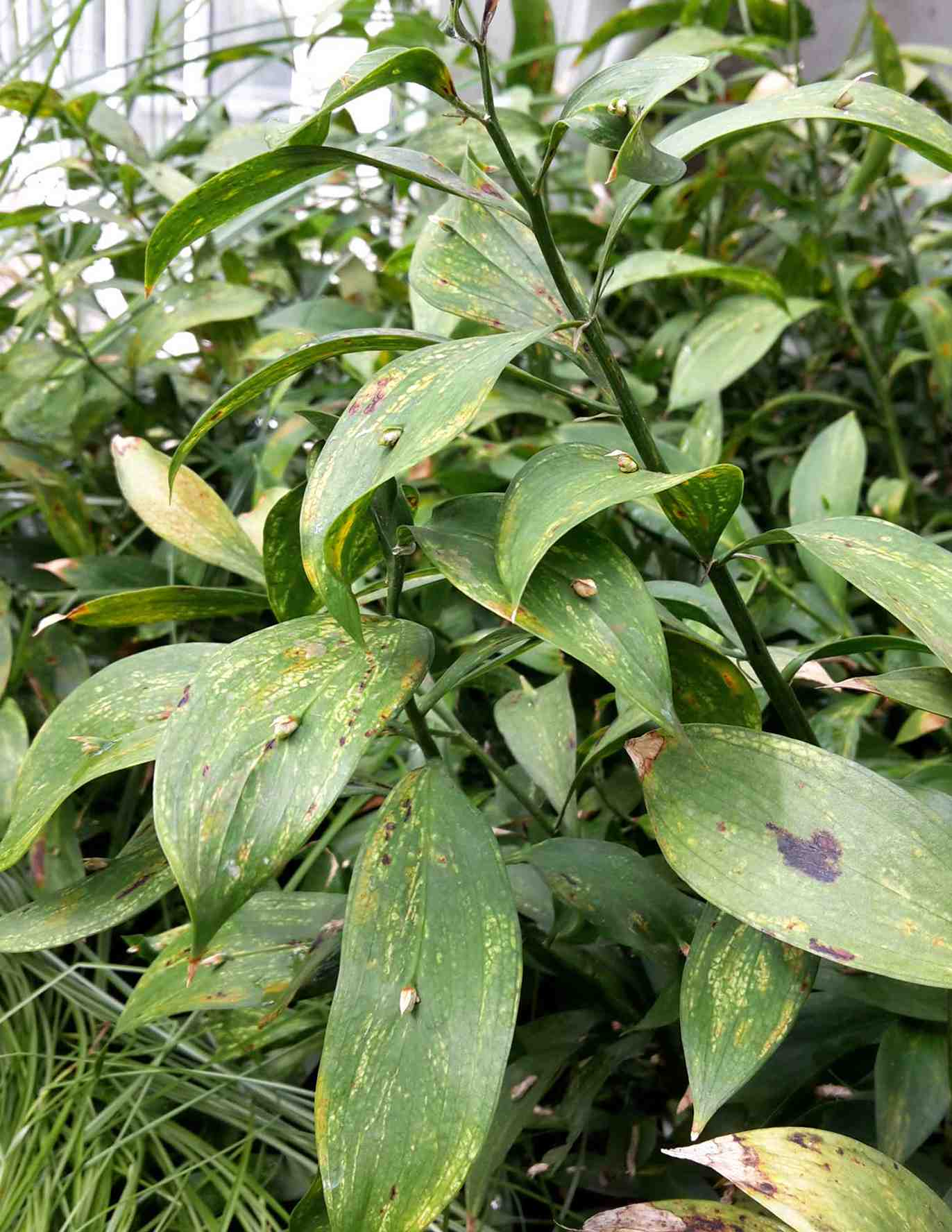
Shrubs.

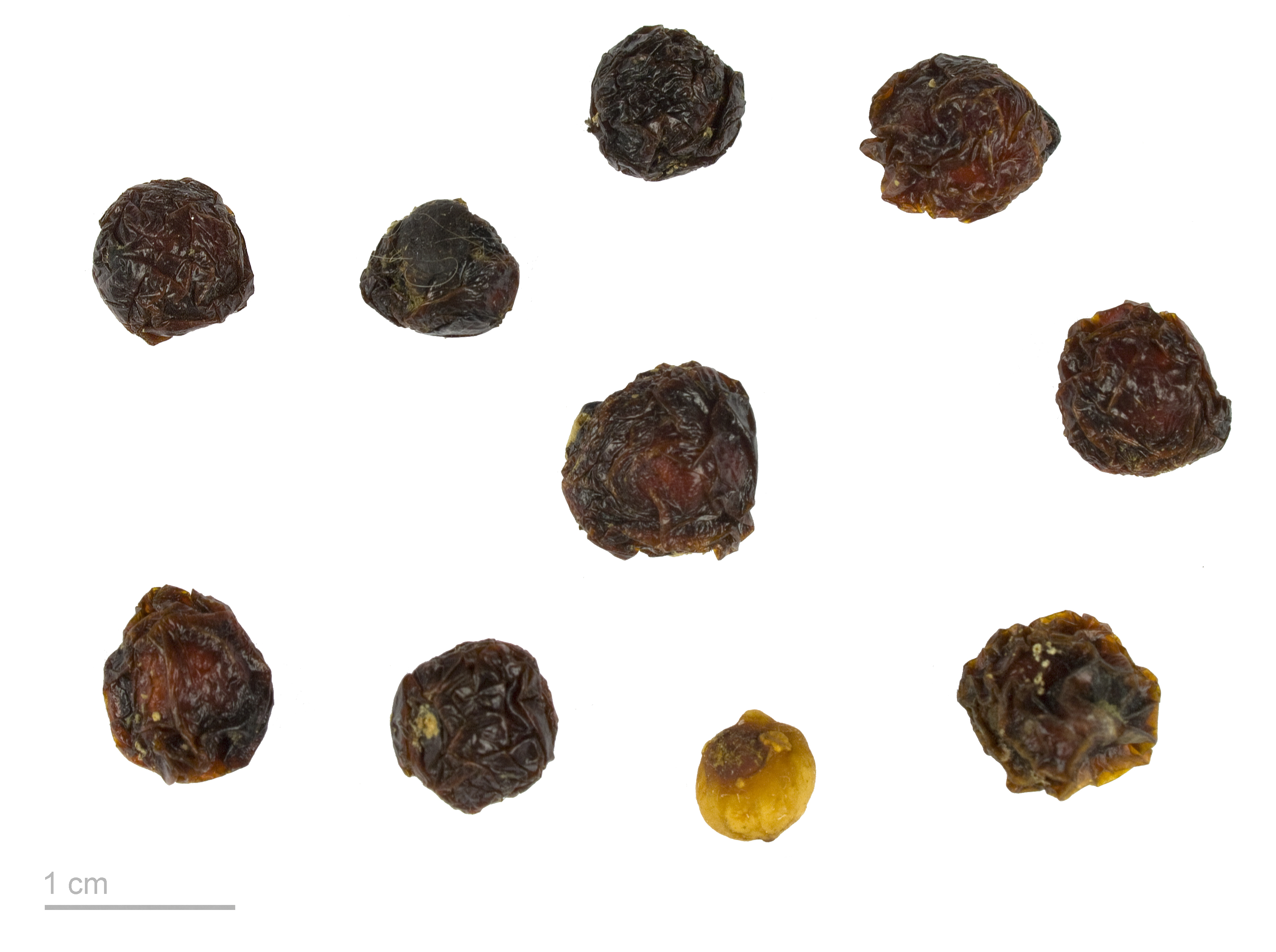
Fruits and seeds.

== Etymology ==
Ruscus is derived from an old Latin name for prickly plants.

The specific epithet hypoglossum is derived from Greek and means 'sheathed beneath' or 'below-a-tongue'. The name is in reference to the cladodes of this species, which extend beneath the flowers.
