= Japanese lily =

Japanese lily is a common name for several plants and may refer to:

- Rohdea japonica
- Lilium speciosum, native to southern Japan and southern China
