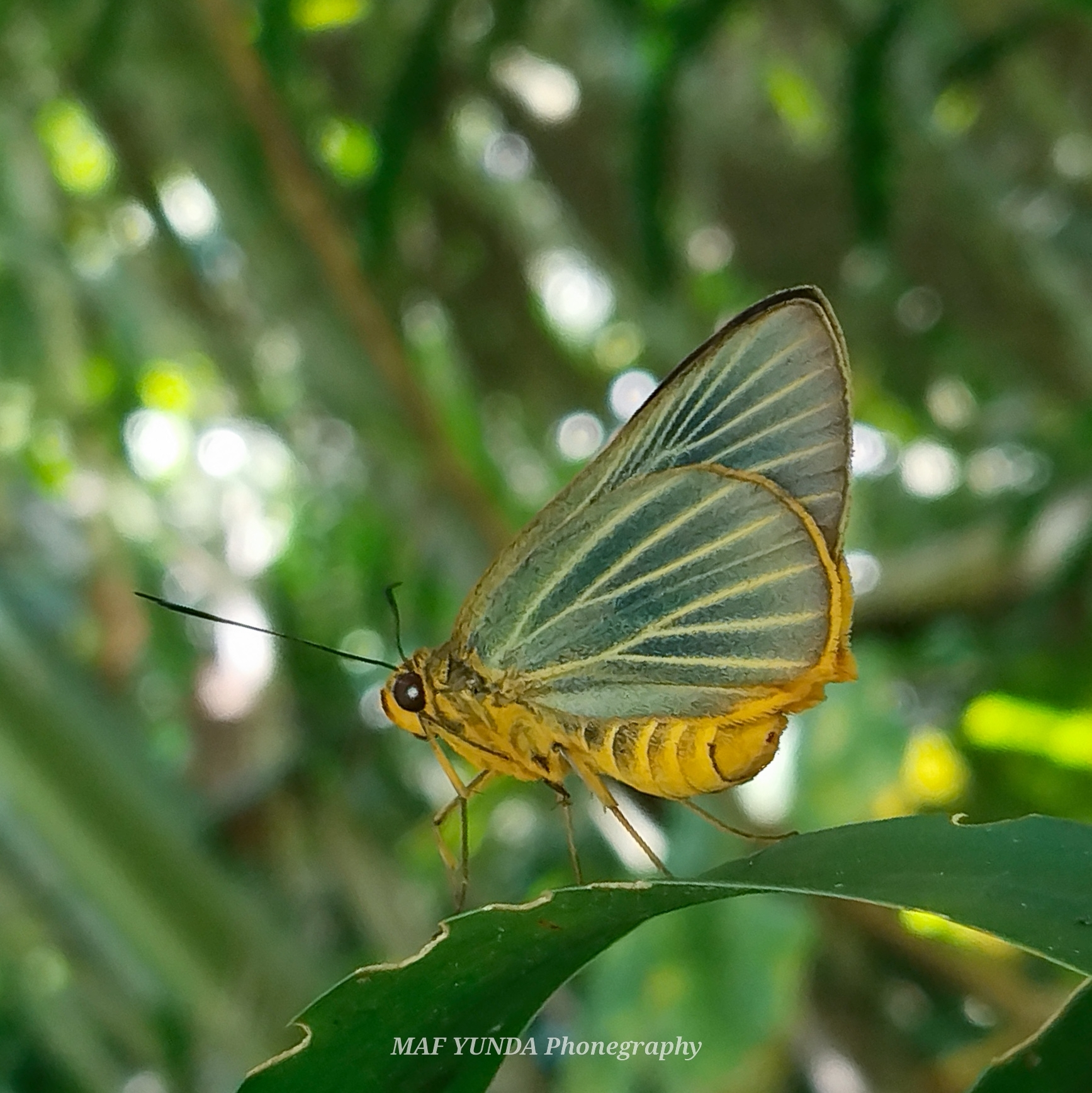
- Pirdana ismene

Scientific classification
- Kingdom: Animalia
- Phylum: Arthropoda
- Clade: Pancrustacea
- Class: Insecta
- Order: Lepidoptera
- Family: Hesperiidae
- Tribe: Megathymini
- Genus: Pirdana; Distant, 1886

= Pirdana =

Genus of butterflies

Pirdana is a genus of grass skippers in the family Hesperiidae.

== Species ==
- Pirdana albicornis Elwes & Edwards, 1897 Borneo
- Pirdana hyela (Hewitson, 1867) Burma, Malaya to Celebes and (P. h. rudolphii Elwes & de Nicéville, [1887] ) Vietnam
- Pirdana distanti Staudinger, 1889 Sumatra, Malaya, Borneo and (P. d. niasica Fruhstorfer, 1916) Nias
- Pirdana fusca de Jong & Treadaway, 1993 Samar
- Pirdana ismene (C. & R. Felder, [1867]) Celebes

== Biology ==
The larvae feed on Dracaena, Cordyline, Peliosanthes and related genera.

== Gallery ==
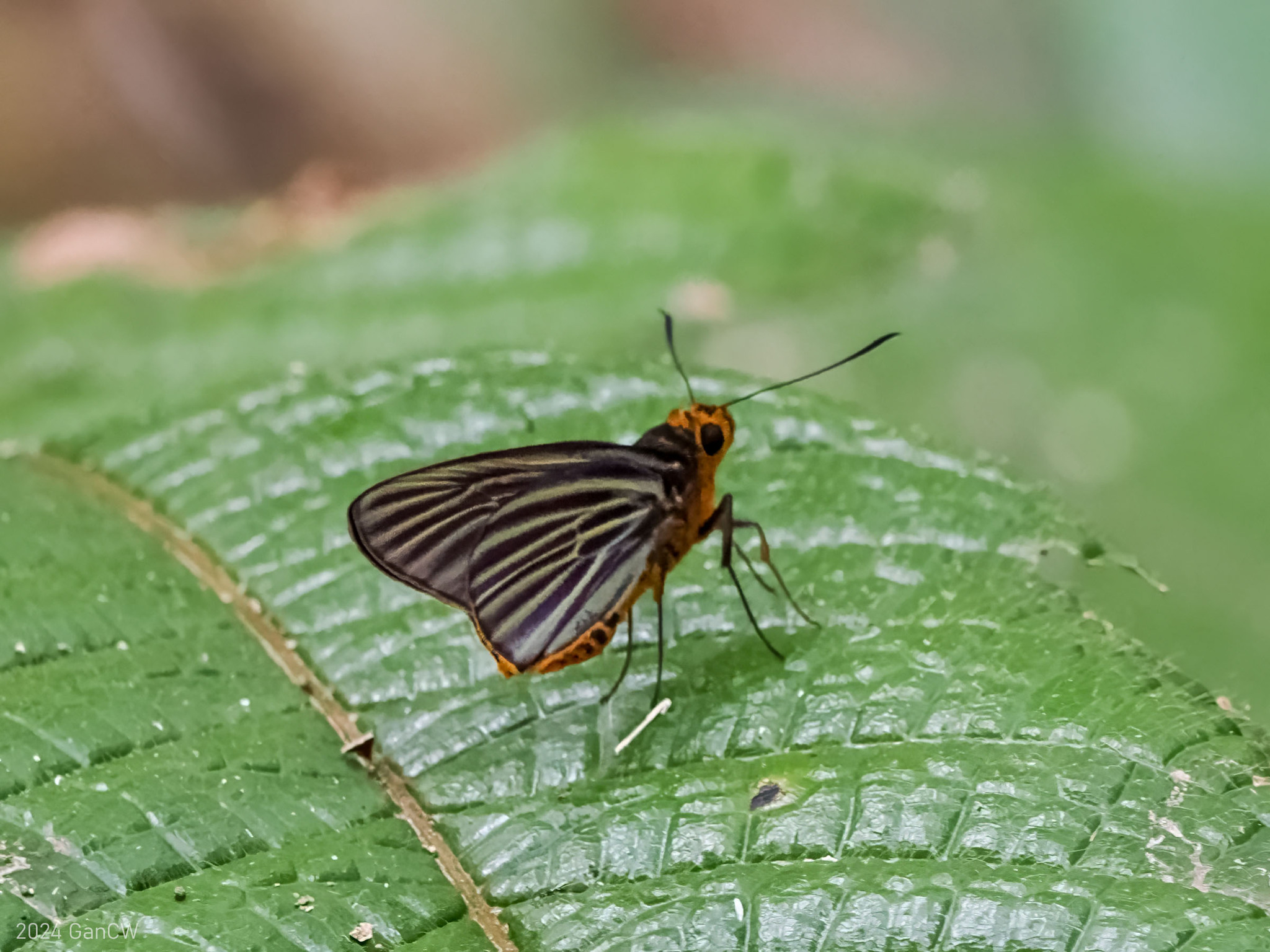
Pirdana fusca

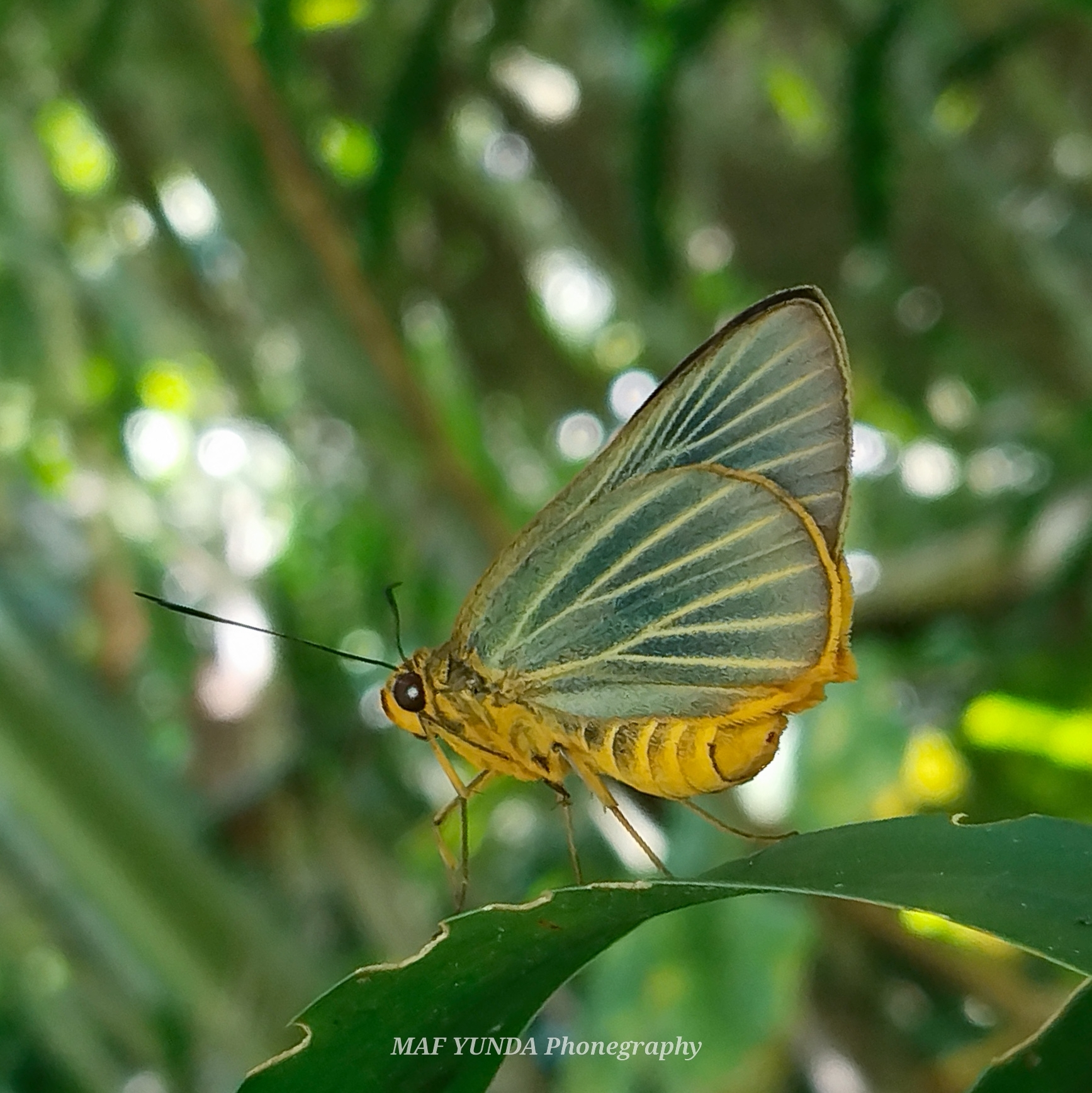
Pirdana ismene
