= Michael Rohde =

Michael Rohde may refer to:

- Michael Rohde (chess player) (born 1959), American chess grandmaster
- Michael Rohde (footballer) (1894-1979), Danish football player
- Michael Rohde (botanist) (1782-1812), German botanist
