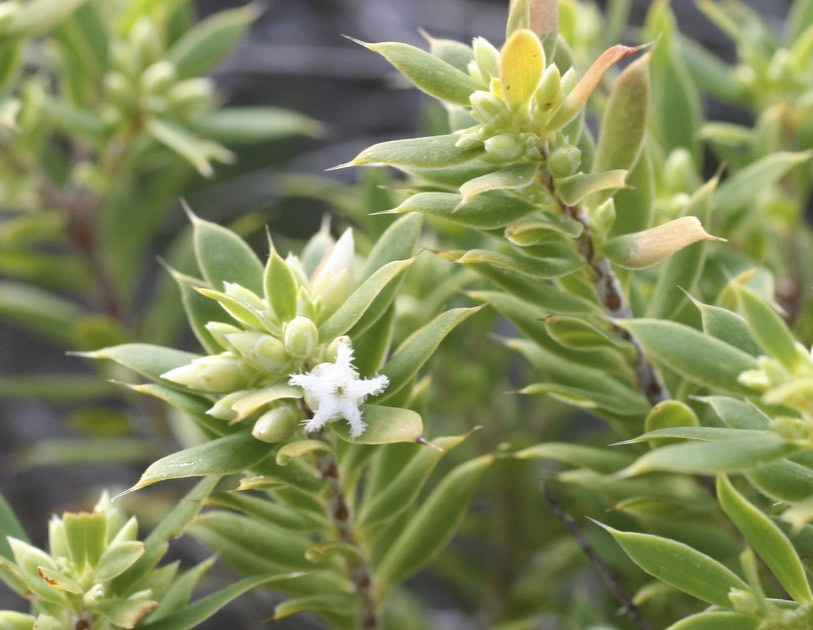
- On Hinchinbrook Island

Scientific classification
- Kingdom: Plantae
- Clade: Tracheophytes
- Clade: Angiosperms
- Clade: Eudicots
- Clade: Asterids
- Order: Ericales
- Family: Ericaceae
- Genus: Styphelia
- Species: S. ruscifolia

Binomial name
- Styphelia ruscifolia (R.Br.) Spreng.
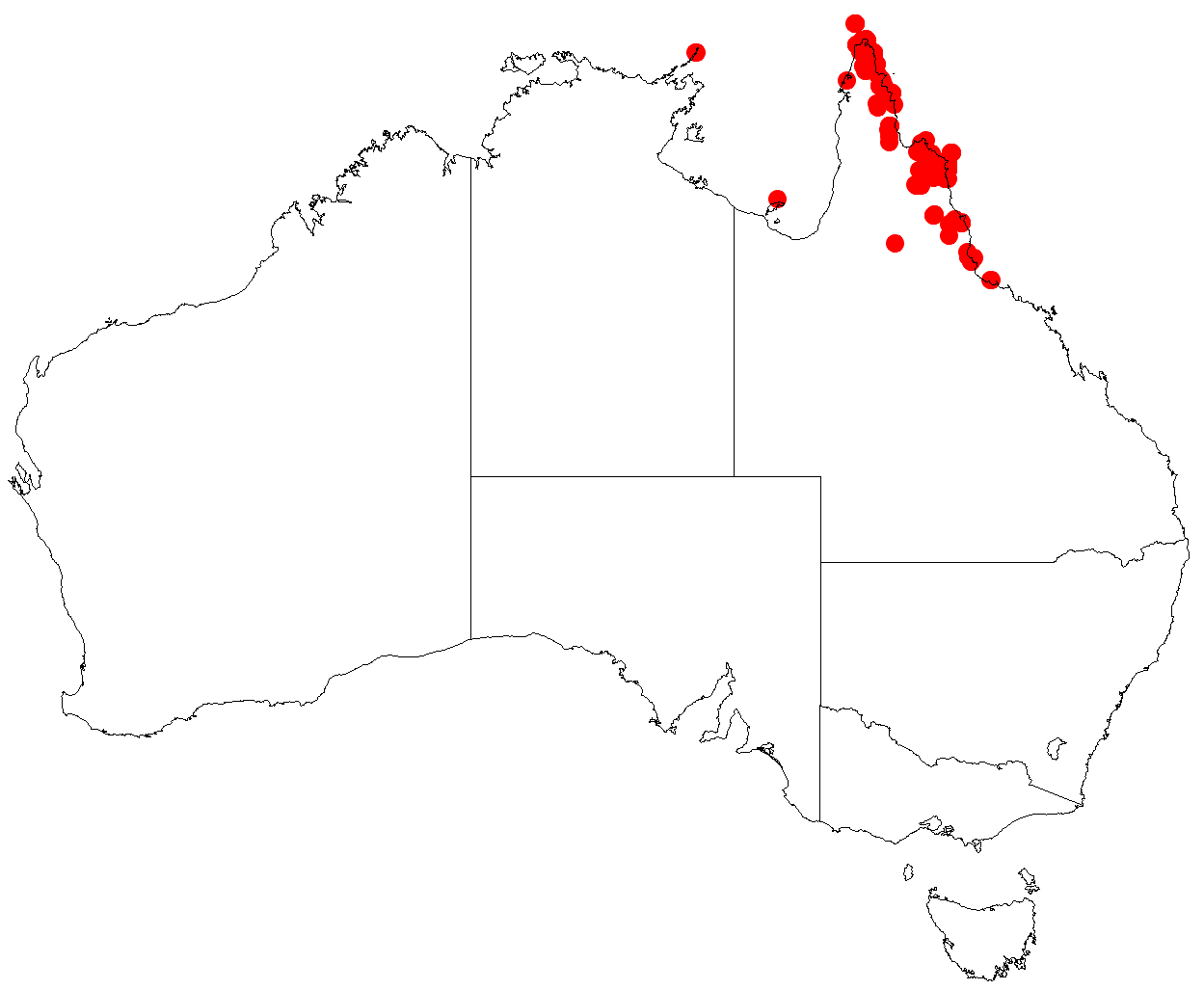
- Occurrence data from AVH

Synonyms
- Leucopogon ruscifolius R.Br.

= Styphelia ruscifolia =

Species of plant

Styphelia ruscifolia is a species of flowering plant in the heath family Ericaceae and is endemic to north Queensland. It is a shrub with oblong to broadly egg-shaped leaves, the narrower end towards the base, and white, tube-shaped flowers usually arranged singly or in pairs in leaf axils.

== Description ==
Styphelia ruscifolia is a shrub that typically grows to a height of 1–4 m (3 ft 3 in – 13 ft 1 in). Its leaves are broadly egg-shaped, the narrower end towards the base, to oblong, 5–13 mm (0.20–0.51 in) long, 3–5 mm (0.12–0.20 in) wide, and sharply pointed. The flowers are borne singly or in pairs in leaf axils, with small bracts and broad bracteoles less than half as long as the sepals. The sepals are about 2 mm (0.079 in) long and striated, the petals white, about 2.3 mm (0.091 in) long and joined at the base, forming an urn-shaped tube with bearded lobes that are longer than the petal tube.

== Taxonomy ==
This species was first formally described in 1810 by Robert Brown who gave it the name Leucopogon ruscifolius in his Prodromus Florae Novae Hollandiae. In 1824, Kurt Polycarp Joachim Sprengel transferred the species to Styphelia as S. ruscifolia in Systema Vegetabilium. The specific epithet (ruscifolia) means "Ruscus-leaved".

== Distribution and habitat ==
Styphelia ruscifolia usually grows in low vegetation on sand dunes in near-coastal areas, and sometimes in forest in mountain areas on Cape York Peninsula and in Far North Queensland.
