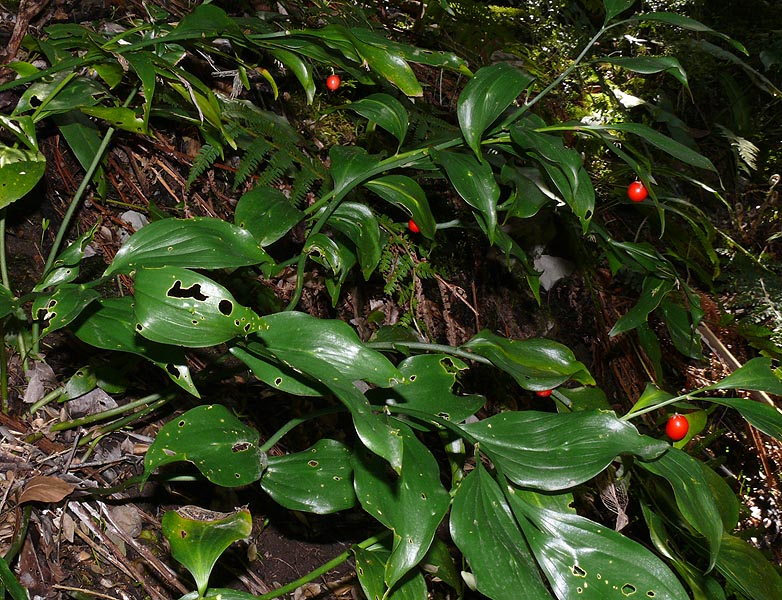

Scientific classification
- Kingdom: Plantae
- Clade: Embryophytes
- Clade: Tracheophytes
- Clade: Angiosperms
- Clade: Monocots
- Order: Asparagales
- Family: Asparagaceae
- Subfamily: Convallarioideae
- Genus: Ruscus
- Species: R. colchicus

Binomial name
- Ruscus colchicus Yeo

Synonyms
- Platyruscus colchicus (Yeo) A.P.Khokhr. & V.N.Tikhom.

= Ruscus colchicus =

Species of flowering plant

Ruscus colchicus is a species of flowering plant in the family Asparagaceae. It is a perennial with ovate leaves, distinct male and female flowers, and spherical berries. The species is native to the Caucasus and Turkey, and was described in 1966.

== Taxonomy ==
The species was described by Peter Frederick Yeo in 1966.

== Distribution ==
Ruscus colchicus is native to the temperate biome of the North Caucasus, South Caucasus, and Turkey.

== Description ==
Ruscus colchicus is a perennial. The stems are up to 60 centimetres (24 in) long. The plant has around twenty-eight cladodes, which are obovate to elliptical, 4–13.5 centimetres (1.6–5.3 in) long, and 2.5–5.3 centimetres (0.98–2.09 in) wide.

The leaves are 6.5–12 millimetres (0.26–0.47 in) long, 3.5–6 millimetres (0.14–0.24 in) wide, ovate, and cauline.

The flower stems are 2.8 millimetres (0.11 in) long. Each plant has either male or female flowers. The outer segments of the perianth are pale green, 2.5–4 millimetres (0.098–0.157 in) long, and 1–1.75 millimetres (0.039–0.069 in) wide. The inner segments of the perianth are sometimes tinged with purple, 1.5–3.5 millimetres (0.059–0.138 in) long, and 0.5–1.25 millimetres (0.020–0.049 in) wide. The fruit is a spherical berry, measuring 10–15 millimetres (0.39–0.59 in) in diameter.

== Nomenclature ==
In Russian, the species is known as Иглица колхидская (Iglica kolhidskaa).
