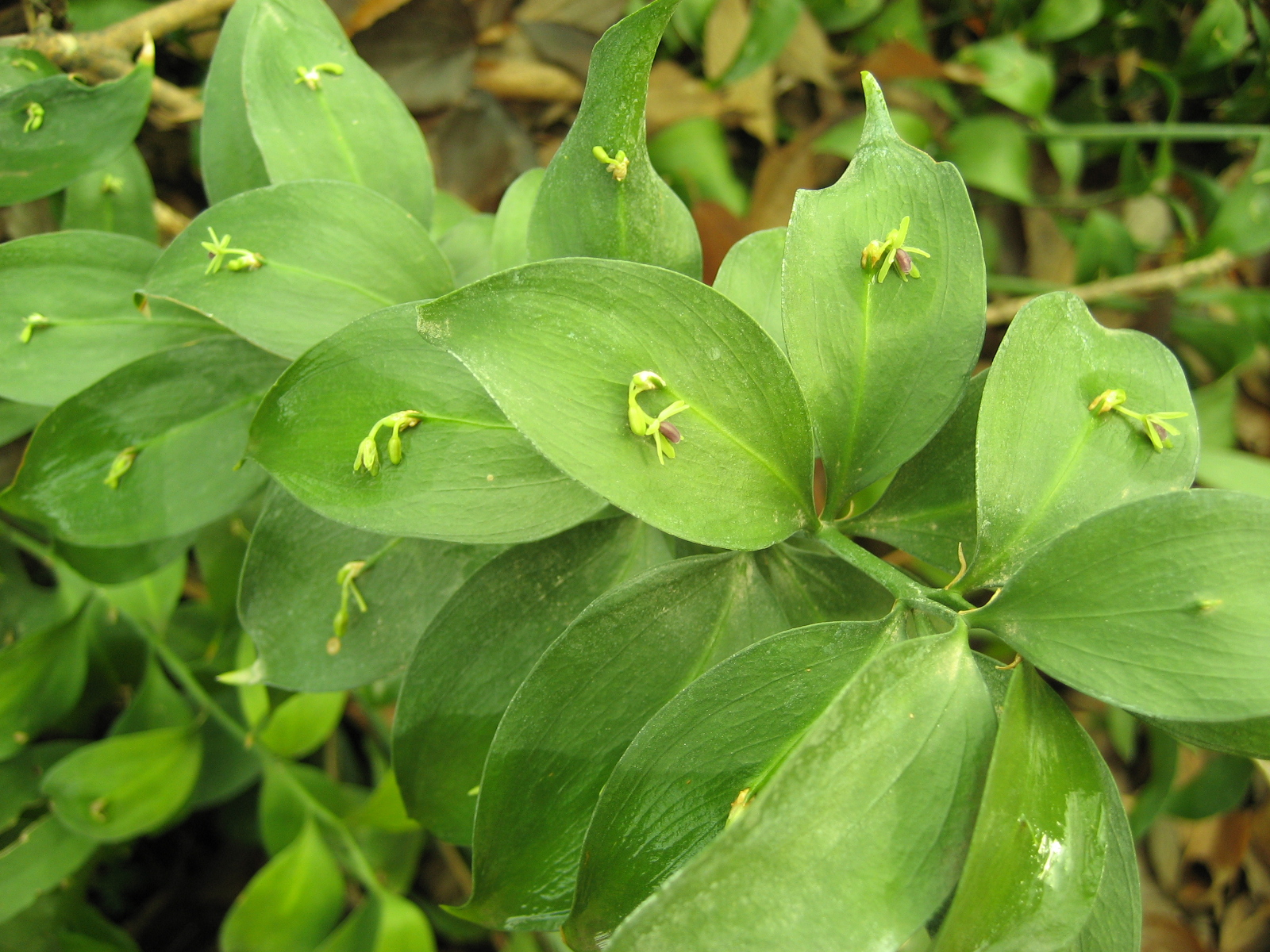

Scientific classification
- Kingdom: Plantae
- Clade: Tracheophytes
- Clade: Angiosperms
- Clade: Monocots
- Order: Asparagales
- Family: Asparagaceae
- Subfamily: Nolinoideae
- Genus: Ruscus
- Species: R. hypophyllum

Binomial name
- Ruscus hypophyllum L.

= Ruscus hypophyllum =

Species of plant

Ruscus hypophyllum is a species of shrub in the family Asparagaceae. They have a self-supporting growth form. Individuals can grow to 0.42 m.

== Sources ==
This article incorporates text from a free content work. Licensed under CC0 (license statement/permission). Text taken from Ruscus hypophyllum. Encyclopedia of Life.
