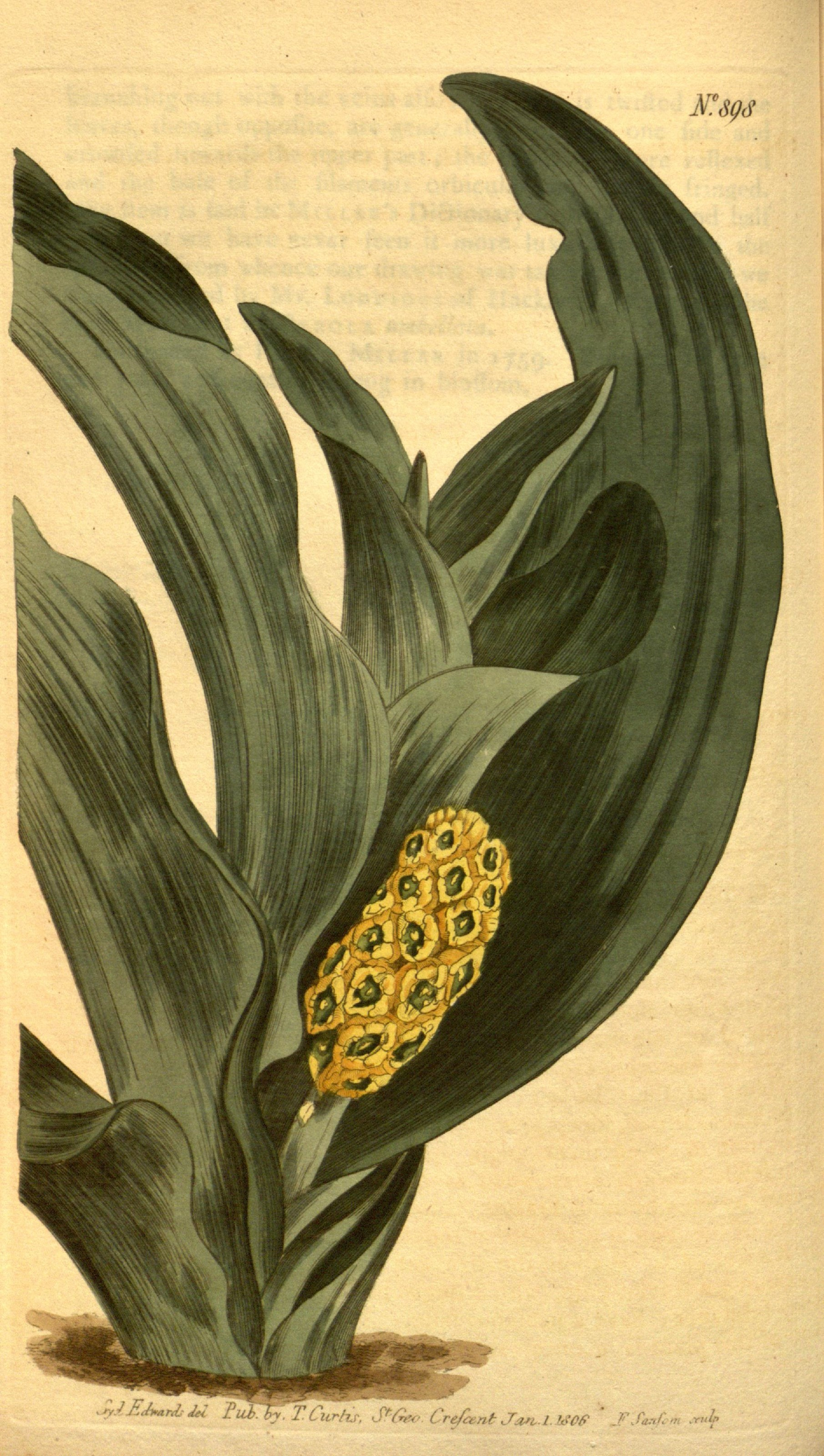
- Rohdea japonica 1806 illustration

Scientific classification
- Kingdom: Plantae
- Clade: Tracheophytes
- Clade: Angiosperms
- Clade: Monocots
- Order: Asparagales
- Family: Asparagaceae
- Subfamily: Convallarioideae
- Genus: Rohdea; Roth

Synonyms
- Titragyne Salisb.; Tilcusta Raf.; Campylandra Baker; Gonioscypha Baker

= Rohdea =

Genus of flowering plants

Rohdea is a genus of plants native to eastern Asia (China, Japan, the Himalayas and Indochina). It was long thought to contain only a single species, R. japonica, but recent studies have resulted in several other taxa being transferred into the genus.

In the APG III classification system, it is placed in the family Asparagaceae, subfamily Convallarioideae (formerly the family Ruscaceae). It has also been placed in the former family Convallariaceae.

Although sometimes misspelled as Rhodea, the genus was actually named after Michael Rohde (1782-1812), a botanist from Bremen.

== Species ==
Accepted species

- Rohdea chinensis (Baker) N.Tanaka - Anhui, Fujian, Guangdong, Guangxi, Henan, Hubei, Hunan, Jiangxi, Shaanxi, Sichuan, Taiwan, Yunnan
- Rohdea chlorantha (Baill.) N.Tanaka - Sichuan
- Rohdea delavayi (Franch.) N.Tanaka - Tibet, Guangxi, Guizhou, Hubei, Hunan, Sichuan, Yunnan
- Rohdea emeiensis (Z.Y.Zhu) N.Tanaka - Sichuan
- Rohdea ensifolia (F.T.Wang & Tang) N.Tanaka - Yunnan
- Rohdea eucomoides (Baker) N.Tanaka - Assam, Bhutan, Myanmar
- Rohdea japonica (Thunb.) Roth - Japan, Korea, Guangxi, Guizhou, Hubei, Hunan, Jiangsu, Jiangxi, Shandong, Sichuan, Zhejiang
- Rohdea jinshanensis (Z.L.Yang & X.G.Luo) N.Tanaka - Sichuan
- Rohdea lichuanensis (Y.K.Yang, J.K.Wu & D.T.Peng) Yamashita & M.N.Tamura - Hubei
- Rohdea longipedunculata (F.T.Wang & S.Yun Liang) N.Tanaka - Yunnan
- Rohdea nepalensis (Raf.) N.Tanaka - Tibet, Nepal, Bhutan, Assam, Myanmar, Sichuan, Yunnan
- Rohdea pachynema (F.T.Wang & Tang) N.Tanaka - Sichuan, Yunnan
- Rohdea siamensis (Yamashita & M.N.Tamura) Yamashita & M.N.Tamura - Laos, Thailand
- Rohdea tonkinensis (Baill.) N.Tanaka - Vietnam, Yunnan, Guangdong
- Rohdea urotepala Hand.-Mazz. - Sichuan, Yunnan
- Rohdea verruculosa (Q.H.Chen) N.Tanaka - Yunnan, Guizhou
- Rohdea wattii (C.B.Clarke) Yamashita & M.N.Tamura - Vietnam, Assam, Bhutan, Guangdong, Guangxi, Guizhou, Sichuan, Yunnan
