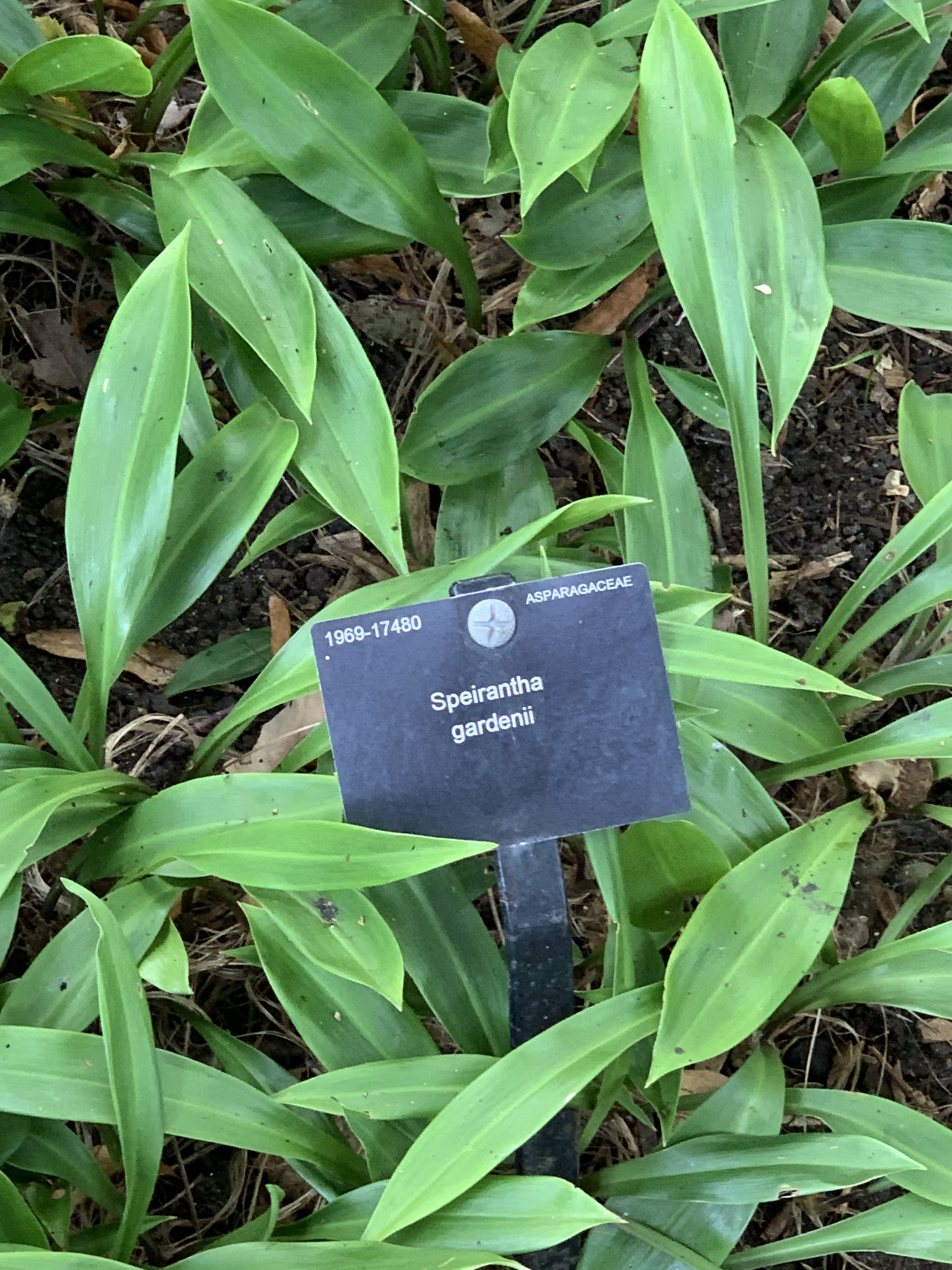

Scientific classification
- Kingdom: Plantae
- Clade: Tracheophytes
- Clade: Angiosperms
- Clade: Monocots
- Order: Asparagales
- Family: Asparagaceae
- Subfamily: Convallarioideae
- Genus: Speirantha; Baker
- Species: S. gardenii

Binomial name
- Speirantha gardenii (Hook.) Baill.

Synonyms
- Speirantha convallarioides Baker (type species); Albuca gardenii Hook.

= Speirantha =

Genus of flowering plants

Speirantha is a genus of one known species of flowering plants found in south-east China. In the APG III classification system, it is placed in the family Asparagaceae, subfamily Convallarioideae (formerly the family Ruscaceae).

The sole species is Speirantha gardenii, endemic to China (provinces of Anhui, Jiangsu, Jiangxi, and Zhejiang).

== Etymology ==
Speirantha is derived from Greek and means 'twisted flower' (spiral + anther).

== Taxonomy ==
The species now called Speirantha gardenii was first described by William Jackson Hooker in 1855 as Albuca gardenii. Separately, in 1875, John Gilbert Baker described Speirantha convallarioides, based on a different type, placing it in his new genus Speirantha. In 1894, Louis Antoine François Baillon synonymized Albuca gardenii and Speirantha convallarioides. The older epithet gardenii has priority, so the correct name is Speirantha gardenii. The type of the genus Speirantha remains the type of Speirantha convallarioides.
