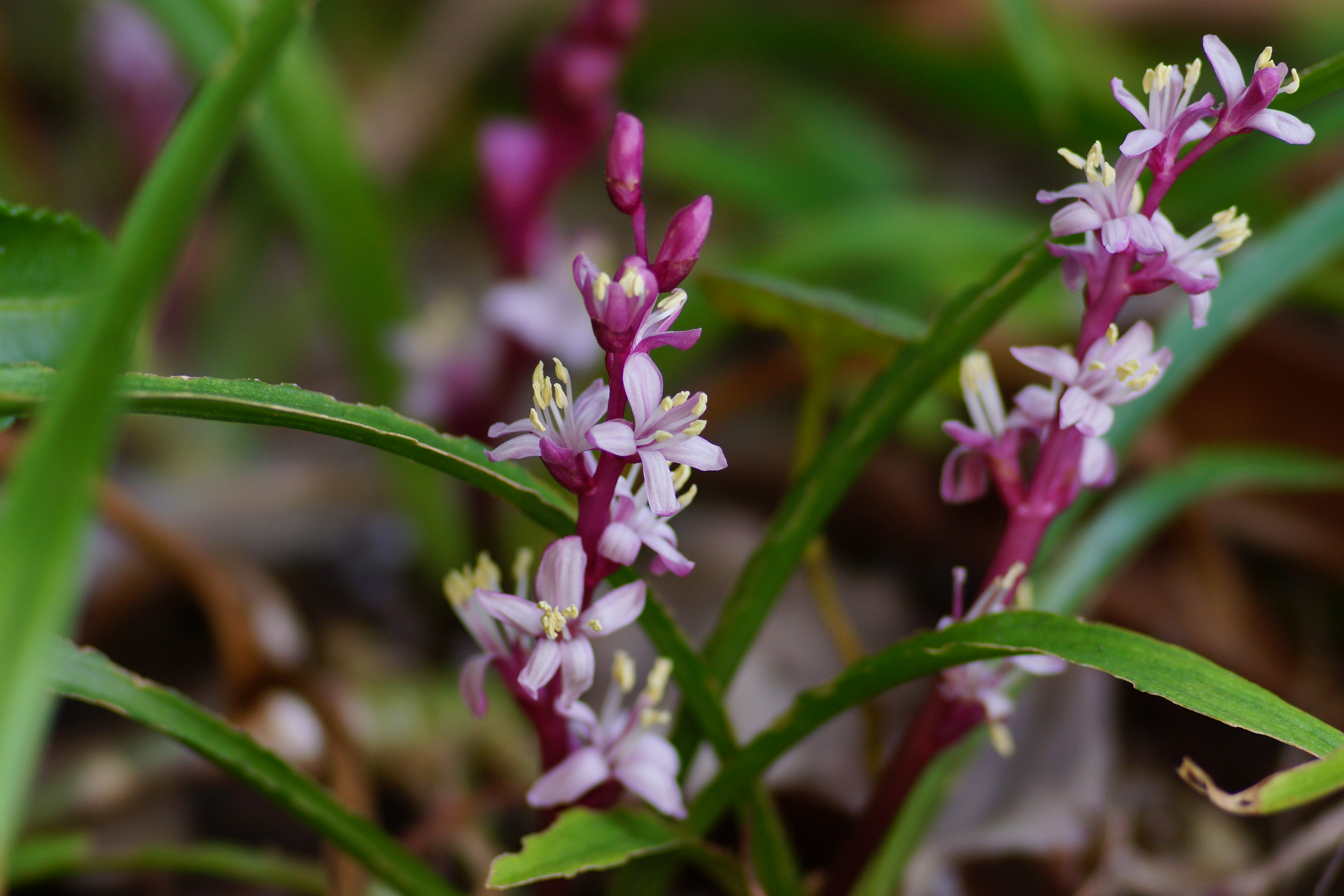

Scientific classification
- Kingdom: Plantae
- Clade: Tracheophytes
- Clade: Angiosperms
- Clade: Monocots
- Order: Asparagales
- Family: Asparagaceae
- Subfamily: Convallarioideae
- Genus: Reineckea; Kunth
- Species: R. carnea

Binomial name
- Reineckea carnea (Andrews) Kunth

Synonyms
- Sanseviella Rchb.; Sansevieria carnea Andrews; Sansevieria sessiliflora Ker Gawl.; Sansevieria rosea F.Dietr.; Sansevieria sarmentosa Jacq.; Sanseviella carnea Rchb. ex Steud.; Ophiopogon thunbergii Schult.f. ex Miq.; Reineckea yunnanensis W.W.Sm.; Reineckea ovata Z.Y.Zhu & Z.R.Chen

= Reineckea =

Genus of flowering plants

Reineckea is a genus of plants in the Convallarioideae. Several species names have been proposed within the genus, but only one is widely accepted: Reineckea carnea, native to China and Japan.

== Etymology ==
Reineckea is named for J. Reinecke, a German grower of tropical plants.
