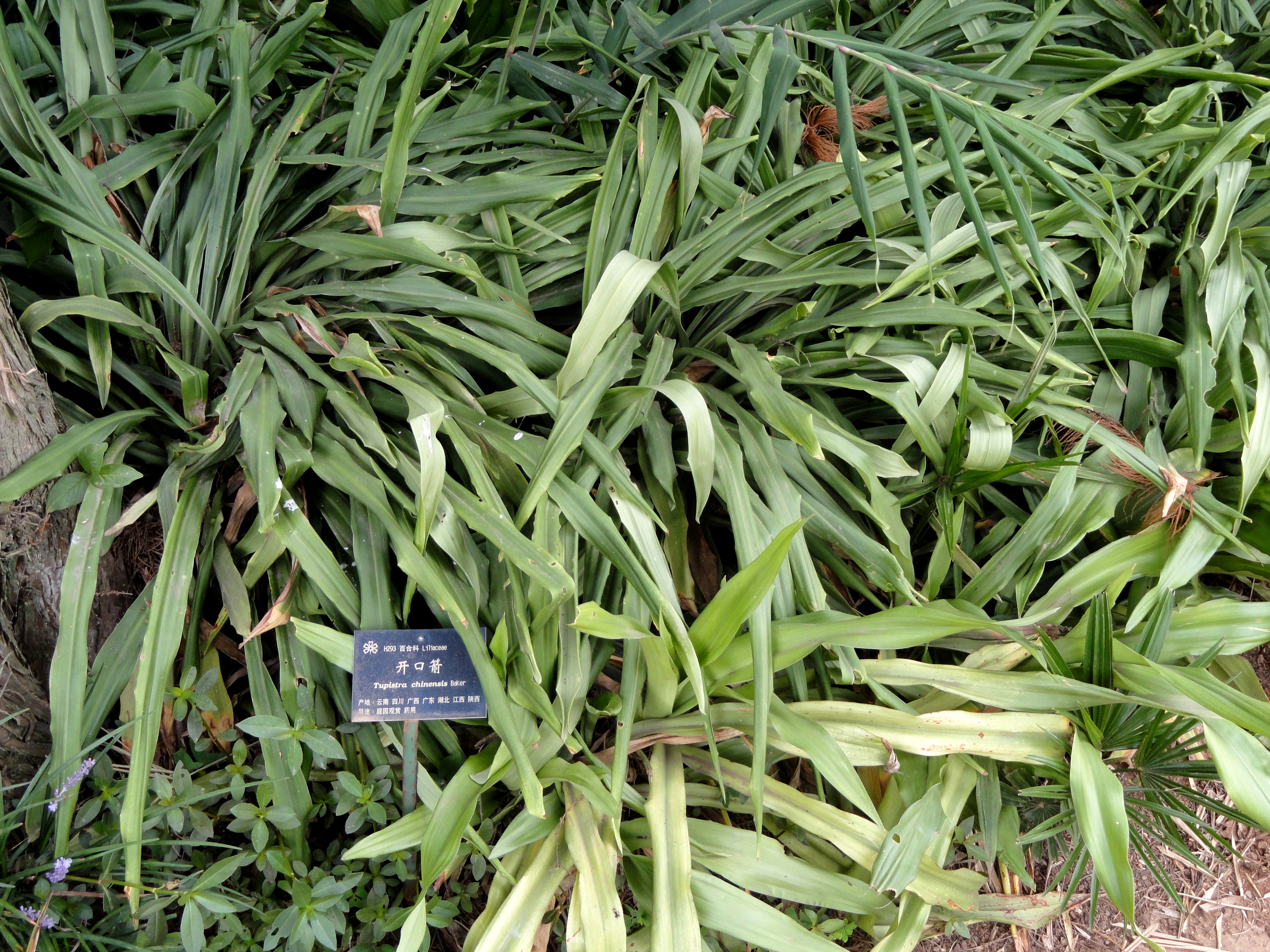
- Tupistra chinensis

Scientific classification
- Kingdom: Plantae
- Clade: Tracheophytes
- Clade: Angiosperms
- Clade: Monocots
- Order: Asparagales
- Family: Asparagaceae
- Subfamily: Convallarioideae
- Genus: Tupistra; Baker

Synonyms
- Macrostigma Kunth; Platymetra Noronha ex Salisb.; Tricalistra Ridl.

= Tupistra =

Genus of flowering plants

Tupistra is a genus of about 20 species of flowering plants found in south Asia, from southern China to Sumatra and Ambon Island. In the APG III classification system, it is placed in the family Asparagaceae, subfamily Convallarioideae (formerly the family Ruscaceae).

== Species ==
As of August 2013, the World Checklist of Selected Plant Families (WCSP) recognized 21 species:

1. Tupistra clarkei Hook.f. - Nepal, Sikkim
2. Tupistra elegans N.Tanaka - Perak
3. Tupistra fungilliformis F.T.Wang & S.Yun Liang - Yunnan, Guangxi
4. Tupistra grandis Ridl. - Malaysia
5. Tupistra grandistigma F.T.Wang & S.Yun Liang - Guangxi, Yunnan, Vietnam
6. Tupistra kressii N.Tanaka - Thailand
7. Tupistra laotica N.Tanaka - Laos
8. Tupistra malaiana N.Tanaka - Thailand, Malaysia
9. Tupistra muricata (Gagnep.) N.Tanaka - Laos, Thailand, Yunnan, Guangxi
10. Tupistra nutans Wall. ex Lindl. - Assam, Bangladesh
11. Tupistra ochracea (Ridl.) N.Tanaka - Malaysia
12. Tupistra penangensis N.Tanaka - Penang Island
13. Tupistra pingbianensis J.L.Huang & X.Z.Liu - Yunnan
14. Tupistra robusta N.Tanaka - Perak
15. Tupistra squalida Ker Gawl. - Ambon
16. Tupistra stoliczana Kurz - Arunachal Pradesh, Assam, Myanmar, Thailand
17. Tupistra sumatrensis N.Tanaka - Sumatra
18. Tupistra theana Aver. & N.Tanaka - Vietnam
19. Tupistra tupistroides (Kunth) Dandy - Sikkim, Bhutan, Assam
20. Tupistra urceolata N.Tanaka & W.J.Kress - Thailand
21. Tupistra violacea Ridl. - Thailand, Malaysia

According to WCSP, the following are synonyms:

- Tupistra albiflora K.Larsen = T. muricata
- Tupistra longispica Y.Wan & X.H.Lu = T. muricata
- Tupistra veratrifolia Kurz ex Dunn = T. stoliczana
- Tupistra verruculosa Q.H.Chen = Rohdea verruculosa (Q.H.Chen) N.Tanaka
