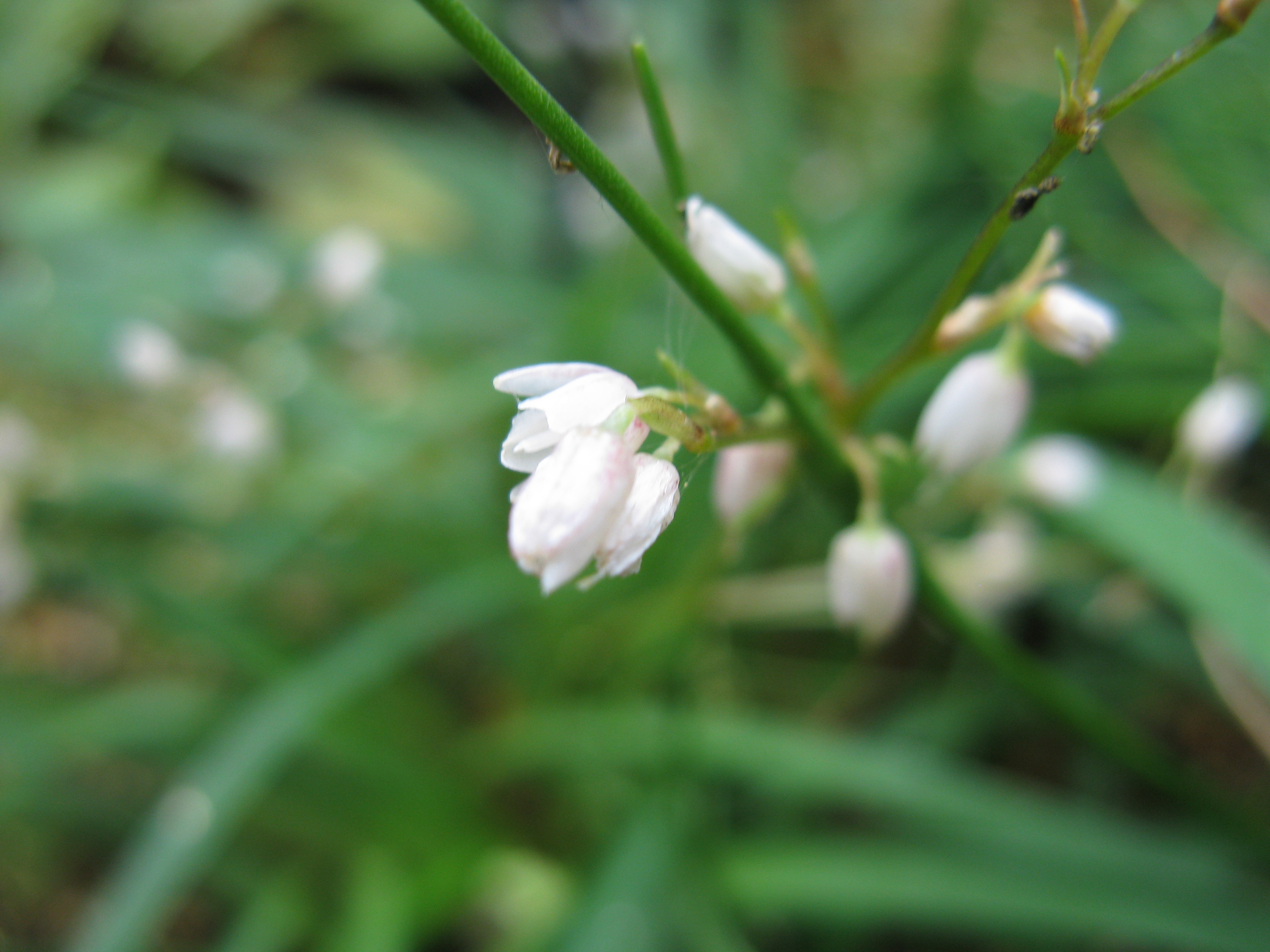
- Cultivated in Osaka Prefectural Flower Garden, Japan

Scientific classification
- Kingdom: Plantae
- Clade: Embryophytes
- Clade: Tracheophytes
- Clade: Spermatophytes
- Clade: Angiosperms
- Clade: Monocots
- Order: Asparagales
- Family: Asparagaceae
- Subfamily: Convallarioideae
- Genus: Comospermum; Hoover
- Species: C. yedoense

Binomial name
- Comospermum yedoense (Maxim. ex Franch. & Sav.) Rauschert

= Comospermum =

Genus of flowering plants

Comospermum is a genus of one species of flowering plant found in southern Japan. In the APG III classification system, it is placed in the family Asparagaceae, subfamily Convallarioideae (formerly the family Ruscaceae).

The only species is Comospermum yedoense (Maxim. ex Franch. & Sav.) Rauschert.
