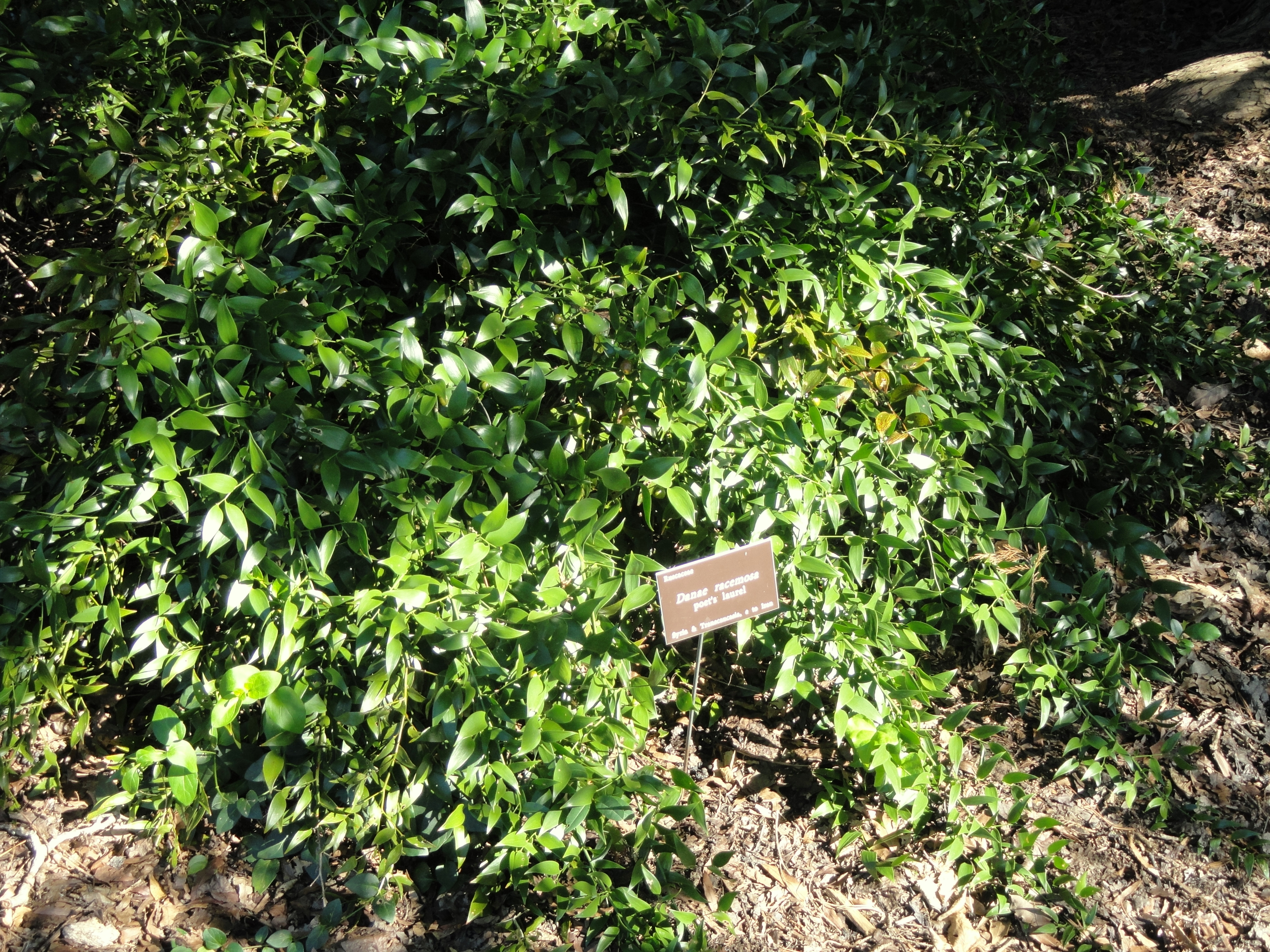

Scientific classification
- Kingdom: Plantae
- Clade: Tracheophytes
- Clade: Angiosperms
- Clade: Monocots
- Order: Asparagales
- Family: Asparagaceae
- Subfamily: Convallarioideae
- Genus: Danae; Medik.
- Species: D. racemosa

Binomial name
- Danae racemosa (L.) Moench

Synonyms
- Ruscus racemosus L.

= Danae racemosa =

Species of flowering plant

Danae is a monotypic genus of flowering plants. The single species, Danae racemosa, is native to west Asia. It is a slow-growing evergreen shrub about 60 cm in diameter and its common names are Alexandrian laurel and poet's laurel. In the APG III classification system, Danae is placed in the family Asparagaceae, subfamily Convallarioideae (formerly the family Ruscaceae).

This shade-loving plant is grown primarily for its elegant glossy green foliage. The small greenish flowers are followed by red berries. It has gained the Royal Horticultural Society's Award of Garden Merit (confirmed 2017).

The hydro-methanolic extract as well as two flavonoids isolated from the leaves of this plant have been found to exhibit anti-nociceptive properties in rats.
