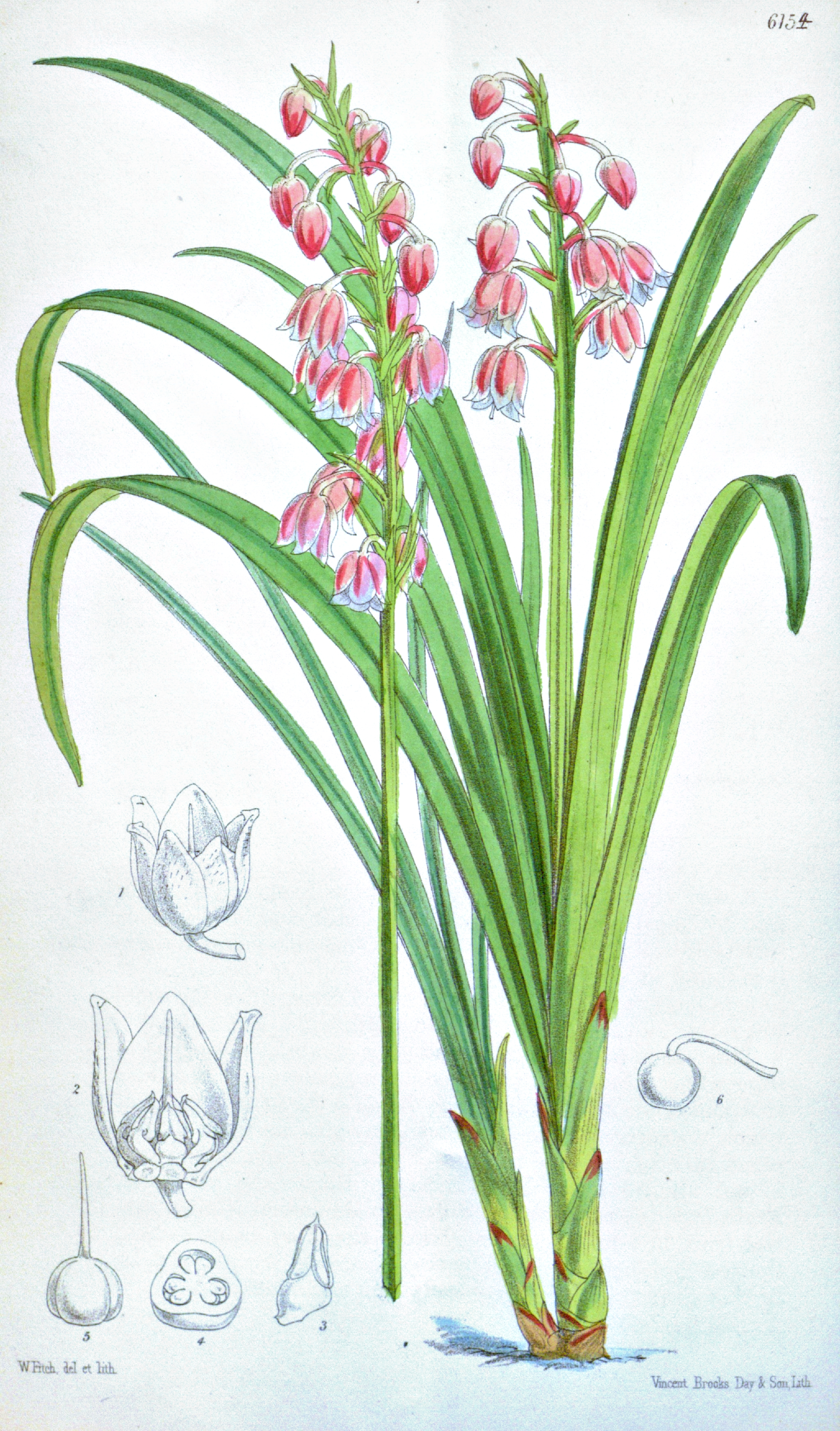
- Botanical drawing of Theropogon pallidus, 1875

Scientific classification
- Kingdom: Plantae
- Clade: Tracheophytes
- Clade: Angiosperms
- Clade: Monocots
- Order: Asparagales
- Family: Asparagaceae
- Subfamily: Convallarioideae
- Genus: Theropogon; Maxim.
- Species: T. pallidus

Binomial name
- Theropogon pallidus (Wall. ex Kunth) Maxim.

Synonyms
- Ophiopogon pallidus Wall. ex Kunth; Ophiopogon minor Royle, without description; Ophiopogon mollis Royle, without description

= Theropogon =

Himalayan theropogon

Genus of flowering plants

Theropogon is a genus of plants in the Convallarioideae. It contains only one known species, Theropogon pallidus, native to Tibet, Yunnan, and the Himalayas (northern and eastern India, Nepal, Bhutan, Sikkim, Assam, Myanmar).
