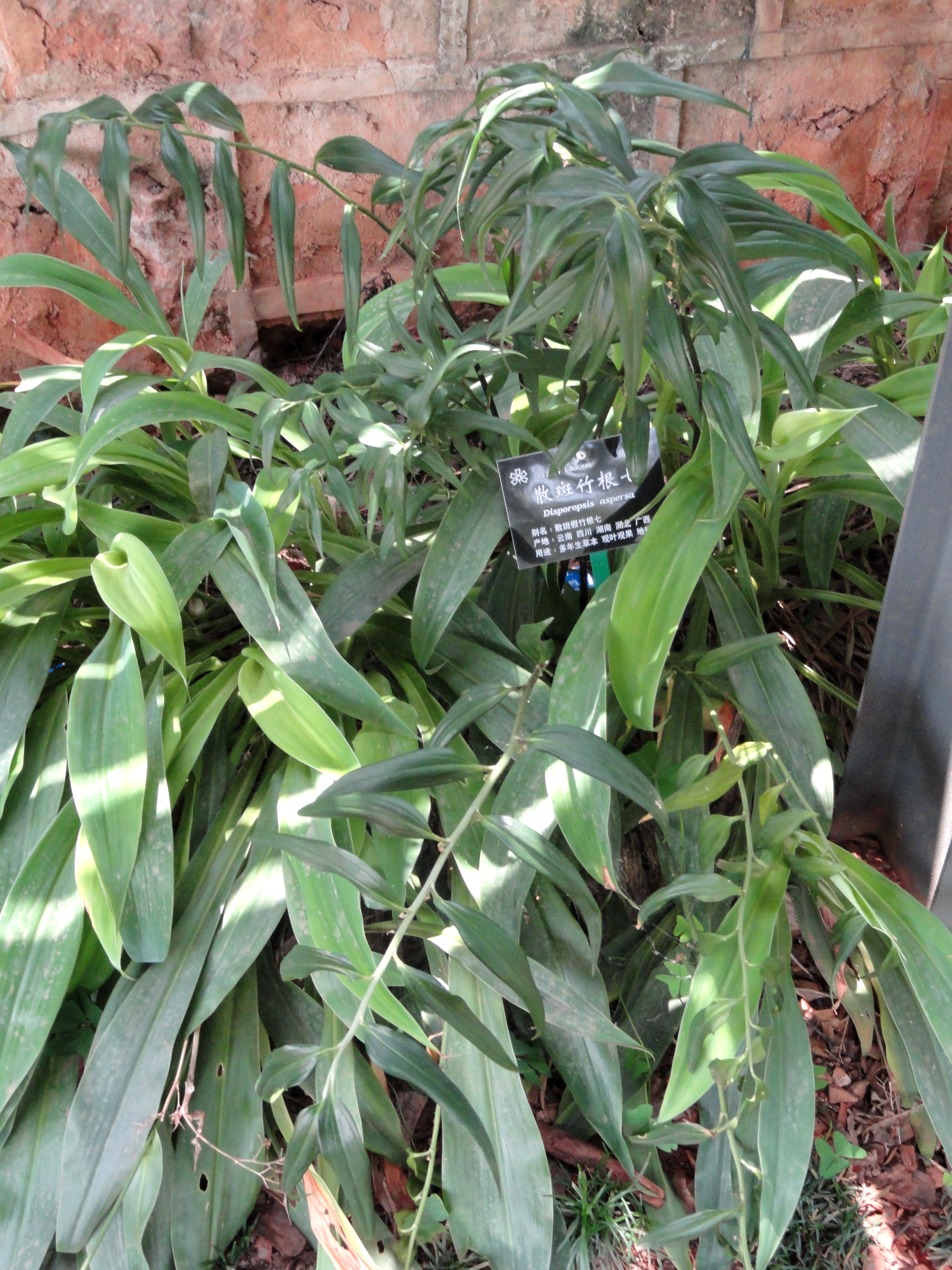
- Disporopsis aspersa

Scientific classification
- Kingdom: Plantae
- Clade: Tracheophytes
- Clade: Angiosperms
- Clade: Monocots
- Order: Asparagales
- Family: Asparagaceae
- Subfamily: Convallarioideae
- Genus: Disporopsis; Hance

Synonyms
- Aulisconema Hua

= Disporopsis =

Genus of flowering plants

Disporopsis is a genus of plants in the Asparagaceae. It is native to China, Indochina and the Philippines.

D. fuscopicta has been demonstrated to contain raphides, at least in its rhizomes, densely and throughout.

== Species ==
- Disporopsis aspersa (Hua) Engl. ex Diels - Guangxi, Hubei, Hunan, Sichuan, Yunnan
- Disporopsis bakerorum Floden - Yunnan
- Disporopsis bodinieri (H.Lév.) Floden - China (Yunnan, Guizhou, NW. Guangxi) to N. Vietnam
- Disporopsis fuscopicta Hance - Philippines, Fujian, Guangdong, Guangxi, Guizhou, Hunan, Jiangxi, Sichuan, Yunnan
- Disporopsis jinfushanensis Z.Y.Liu - Sichuan
- Disporopsis longifolia Craib - Laos, Thailand, Vietnam, Guangxi, Yunnan
- Disporopsis luzoniensis (Merr.) J.M.H.Shaw - Luzon
- Disporopsis pernyi (Hua) Diels - Guangdong, Guangxi, Guizhou, Hunan, Jiangxi, Sichuan, Taiwan, Yunnan, Zhejiang
- Disporopsis undulata Tamura & Ogisu - Sichuan
- Disporopsis yui Floden - China (Yunnan) to N. Myanmar

== Bibliography ==
- Liu, Yingjiao; Liu, Canhuang; Yu, Yafei; Xu, Bei; Gong, Limin; Zeng, Xiaoyan; Xiao, Lan; Cheng, Qilai; Liu, Tasi (2014-11-19). "Authentication of Polygonati Odorati Rhizoma and other two Chinese Materia Medica of the Liliaceae family by pharmacognosy technique with GC–MS analysis". Microscopy Research and Technique. 78 (2). doi:10.1002/jemt.22453. eISSN 1097-0029.
