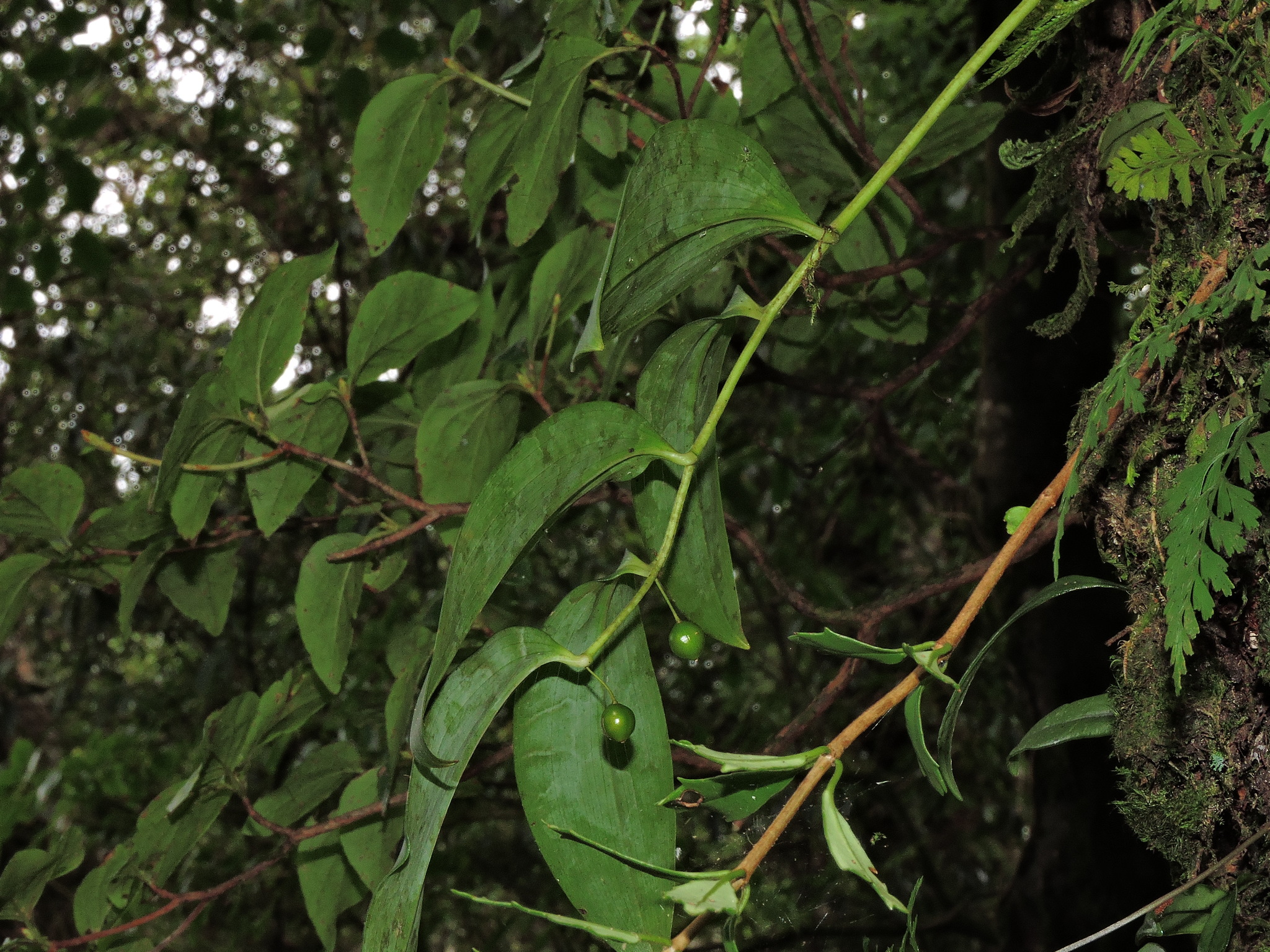
- Heteropolygonatum alte-lobatum

Scientific classification
- Kingdom: Plantae
- Clade: Tracheophytes
- Clade: Angiosperms
- Clade: Monocots
- Order: Asparagales
- Family: Asparagaceae
- Subfamily: Convallarioideae
- Genus: Heteropolygonatum; M.N.Tamura & Ogisu

= Heteropolygonatum =

Genus of flowering plants

Heteropolygonatum is a genus of flowering plants in the family Asparagaceae, subfamily Convallarioideae. It is native to China, Taiwan and Vietnam. The genus includes 12 accepted species.

Some of the species are:

- Heteropolygonatum ginfushanicum (F.T.Wang & Tang) M.N.Tamura, S.C.Chen & Turland - Sichuan, Hubei, Guizhou
- Heteropolygonatum ogisui M.N.Tamura & J.M.Xu - Sichuan
- Heteropolygonatum pendulum (Z.G.Liu & X.H.Hu) M.N.Tamura & Ogisu - Sichuan
- Heteropolygonatum roseolum M.N.Tamura & Ogisu - Guangxi
- Heteropolygonatum urceolatum J.M.H.Shaw - Guangxi, Vietnam
- Heteropolygonatum xui W.K.Bao & M.N.Tamura - Sichuan
