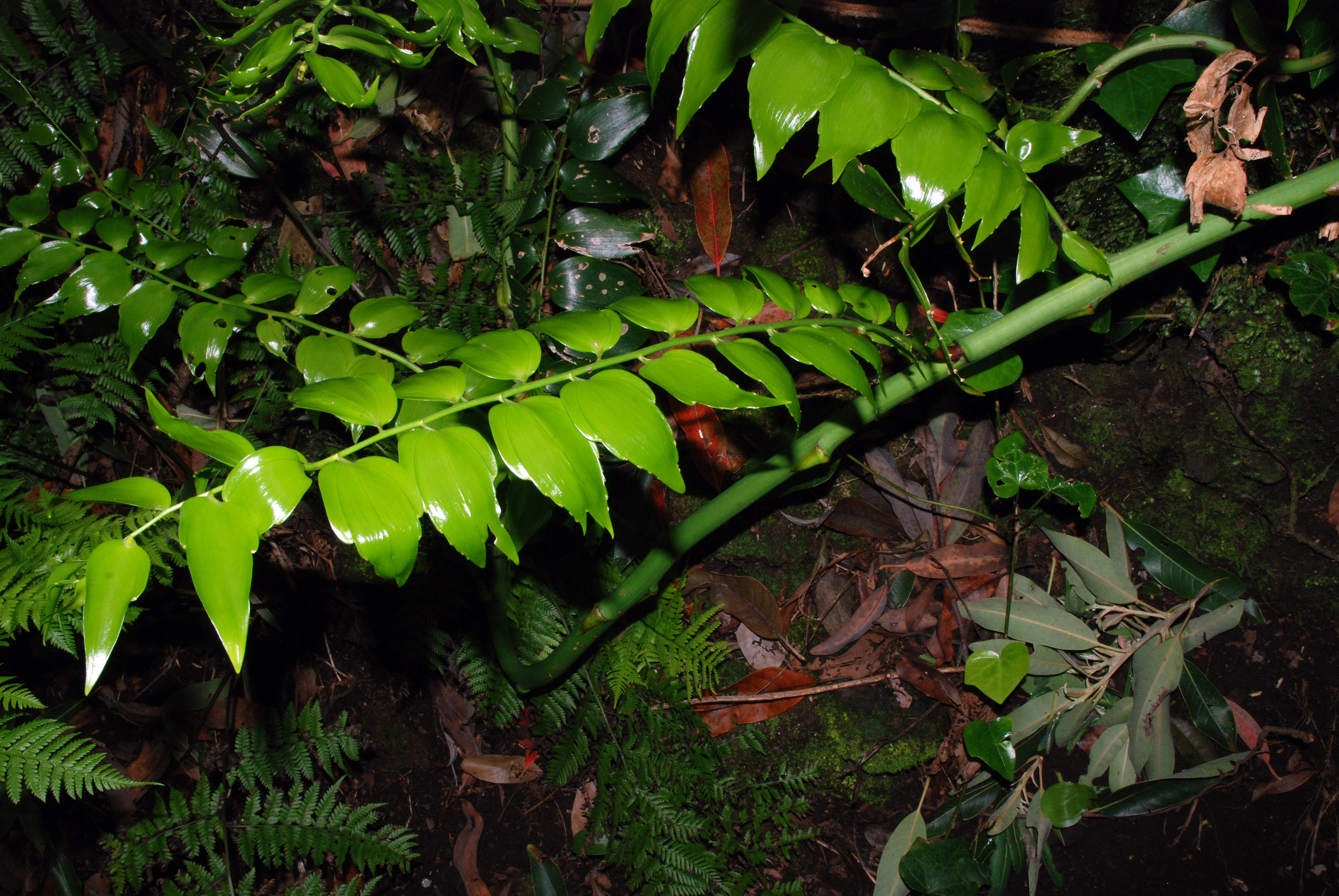
- Semele androgyna

Scientific classification
- Kingdom: Plantae
- Clade: Tracheophytes
- Clade: Angiosperms
- Clade: Monocots
- Order: Asparagales
- Family: Asparagaceae
- Subfamily: Convallarioideae
- Genus: Semele; Andrews

Synonyms
- Amphion Salisb.

= Semele (plant) =

Genus of flowering plants

Semele is a genus of flowering plants native to the Canary Islands and Madeira. In the APG III classification system, it is placed in the family Asparagaceae, subfamily Convallarioideae (formerly the family Ruscaceae).

Three species are recognized:

- Semele androgyna (L.) Kunth - Canary Islands and Madeira
- Semele gayae (Webb & Berthel.) Svent. & Kunkel - Gran Canaria
- Semele menezesii J.G.Costa - Madeira
