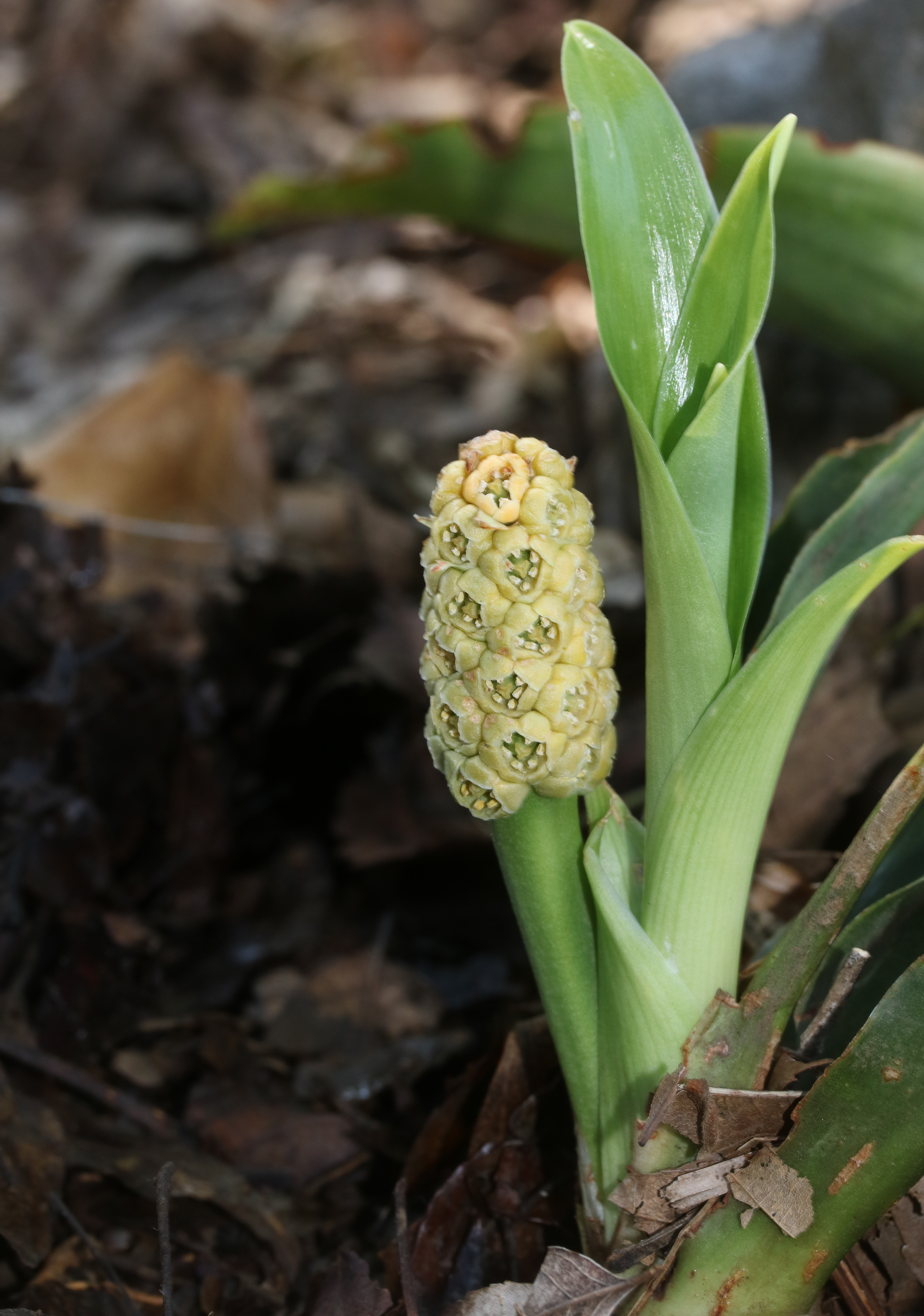
- Rohdea japonica flowers, Mount Fujiwara, Suzuka Mountains, Inabe, Mie Prefecture, Japan
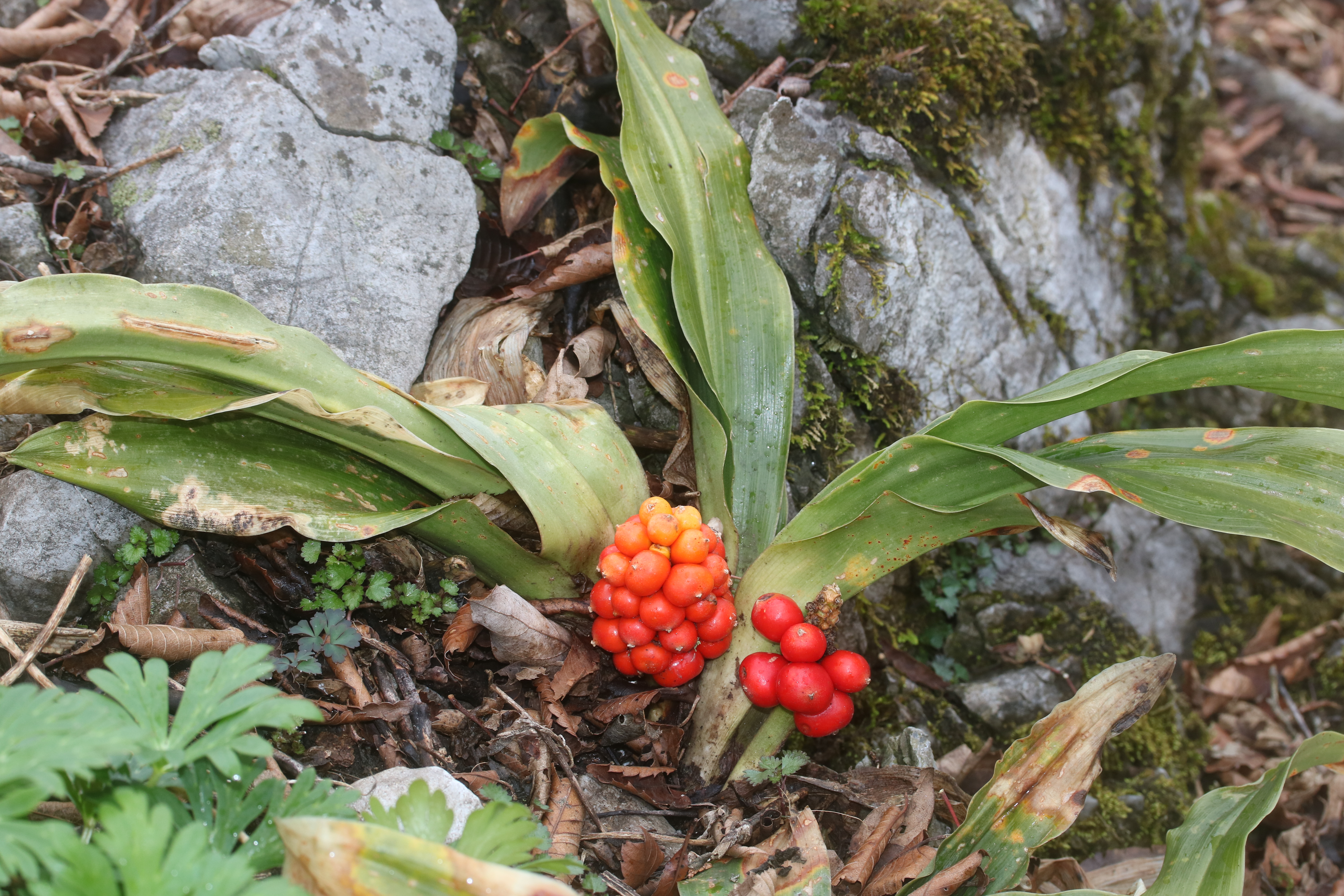
- Rohdea japonica fruit, Mount Fujiwara, Suzuka Mountains, Inabe, Mie Prefecture, Japan

Scientific classification
- Kingdom: Plantae
- Clade: Tracheophytes
- Clade: Angiosperms
- Clade: Monocots
- Order: Asparagales
- Family: Asparagaceae
- Subfamily: Convallarioideae
- Genus: Rohdea
- Species: R. japonica

Binomial name
- Rohdea japonica Roth

Synonyms
- Orontium japonicum Thunb. in J.A.Murray; Orontium liliifolium Salisb.; Rohdea esquirolii H.Lév.; Rohdea sinensis H.Lév.; Rohdea japonica var. latifolia Hatus.

= Rohdea japonica =

Species of flowering plant

Rohdea japonica is a species of plant native to Japan, China and Korea. Common names include Nippon lily, sacred lily, and Japanese sacred lily.

It is a rhizomatous herbaceous perennial plant, with fibrous roots. The leaves are evergreen, broad lanceolate, 15–50 cm long and 2.5–7 cm broad, with an acute apex. The flowers are produced in a short, stout, dense spike 3–4 cm long, each flower pale yellowish, 4–5 mm long. This is a rare instance of pollination by snails. The fruit is a red berry 8 mm diameter, produced in a tight cluster of several together.

== Cultivation and uses ==
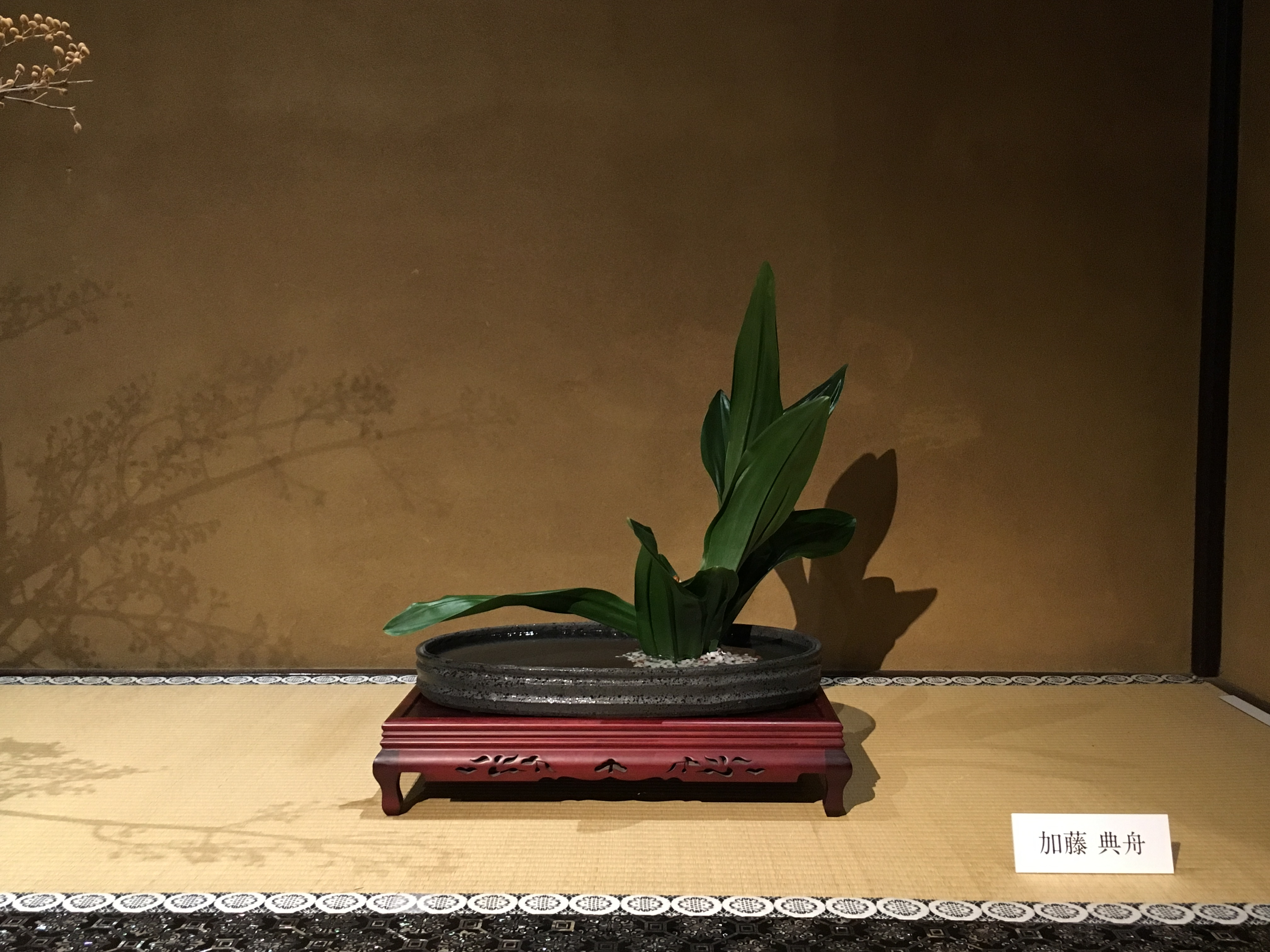
Traditional arrangement of Kinka Ikenobō school using omoto (Rohdea japonica)

It is cultivated as an ornamental plant. In Chinese it is called wan nian qing (simplified: 万年青; traditional: 萬年青; lit. "evergreen"), and for this reason has been used symbolically in visual culture (e.g. on Mao badges). In Japanese it is called omoto.

The plant is also used in traditional Chinese medicine, though it is generally regarded as inedible and possibly toxic.
