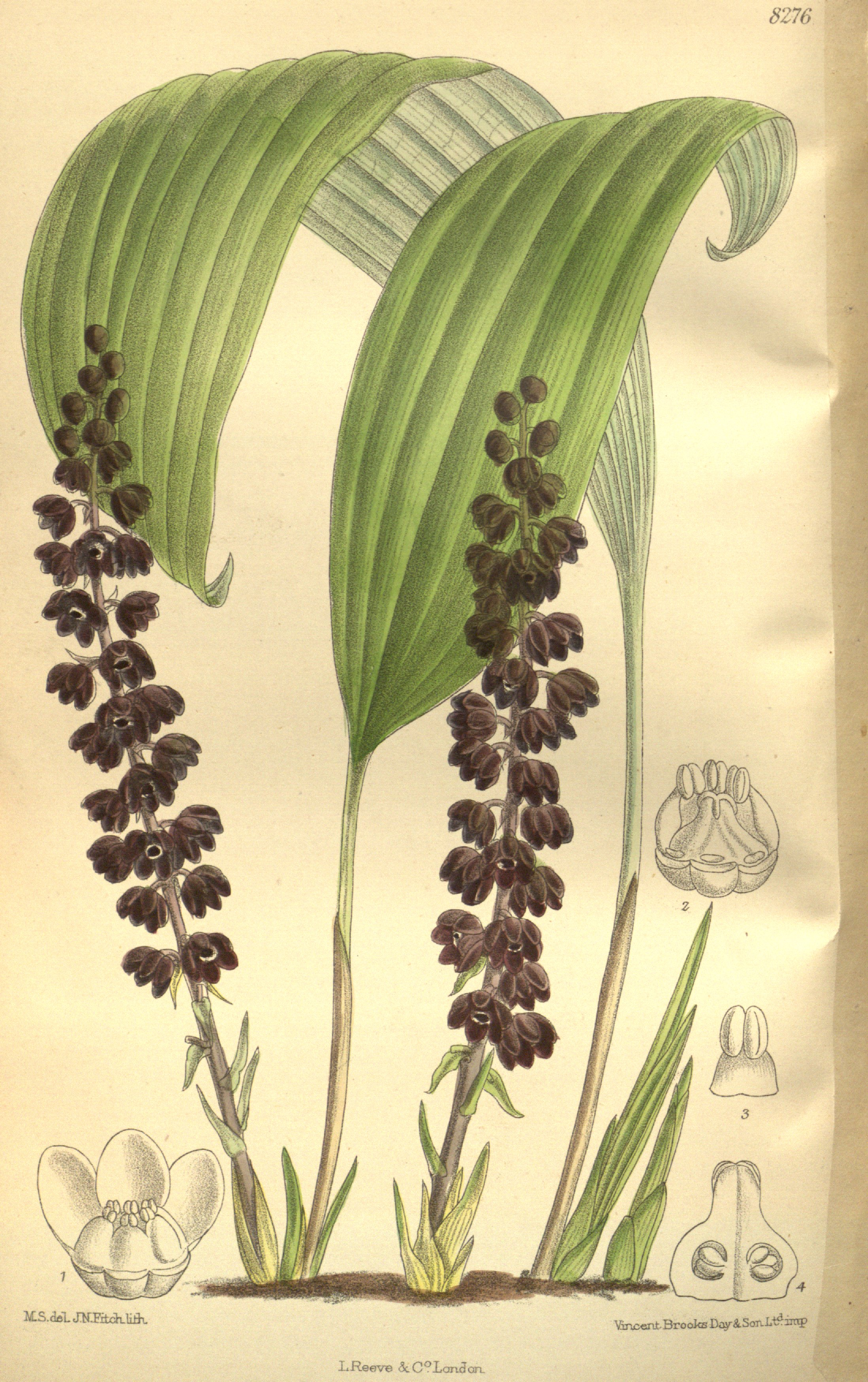
- Peliosanthes teta subsp. humilis (as Peliosanthes violacea var. clarkei)

Scientific classification
- Kingdom: Plantae
- Clade: Tracheophytes
- Clade: Angiosperms
- Clade: Monocots
- Order: Asparagales
- Family: Asparagaceae
- Subfamily: Convallarioideae
- Genus: Peliosanthes; Andrews

Synonyms
- Bulbisperma Reinw. ex Blume; Bulbospermum Blume; Teta Roxb.; Lourya Baill.; Neolourya L.Rodr.

= Peliosanthes =

Genus of flowering plants

Peliosanthes is a genus of flowering plants found in eastern Asia. In the APG III classification system, it is placed in the family Asparagaceae, subfamily Convallarioideae (formerly the family Ruscaceae).

== Species ==
Plants of the World Online currently (2024) includes 63 accepted species, examples:

- Peliosanthes argenteostriata Aver. & N.Tanaka - Vietnam
- Peliosanthes caesia J.M.H.Shaw - Thailand
- Peliosanthes curnberlegii K.Larsen - Thailand
- Peliosanthes dehongensis H.Li - Yunnan
- Peliosanthes divaricatanthera N.Tanaka - Yunnan, Vietnam
- Peliosanthes gracilipes (Craib) N.Tanaka - Thailand, Laos
- Peliosanthes grandiflora Aver. & N.Tanaka - Vietnam
- Peliosanthes griffithii Baker - Sikkim, Nepal
- Peliosanthes kaoi Ohwi - Taiwan
- Peliosanthes macrophylla Wall. ex Baker - Assam, Bhutan, Nepal, Yunnan
- Peliosanthes macrostegia Hance - Guangdong, Guangxi, Guizhou, Hunan, Sichuan, Taiwan, Yunnan
- Peliosanthes nivea Aver. & N.Tanaka - Vietnam
- Peliosanthes nutans Aver. & N.Tanaka - Vietnam
- Peliosanthes ophiopogonoides F.T.Wang & Tang - Yunnan
- Peliosanthes pachystachya W.H.Chen & Y.M.Shui - Yunnan
- Peliosanthes reflexa M.N.Tamura & Ogisu - Guangxi
- Peliosanthes retroflexa Aver. & N.Tanaka - Vietnam
- Peliosanthes sessilis H.Li - Yunnan
- Peliosanthes sinica F.T.Wang & Tang - Yunnan, Guangxi
- Peliosanthes subcoronata N.Tanaka - Laos
- Peliosanthes teta Andrews - southern China, Himalayas, Indochina, Malaysia, western Indonesia
- Peliosanthes weberi (L.Rodr.) N.Tanaka - Thailand, Laos, Cambodia, Vietnam
- Peliosanthes yunnanensis F.T.Wang & Tang - Yunnan, Vietnam
