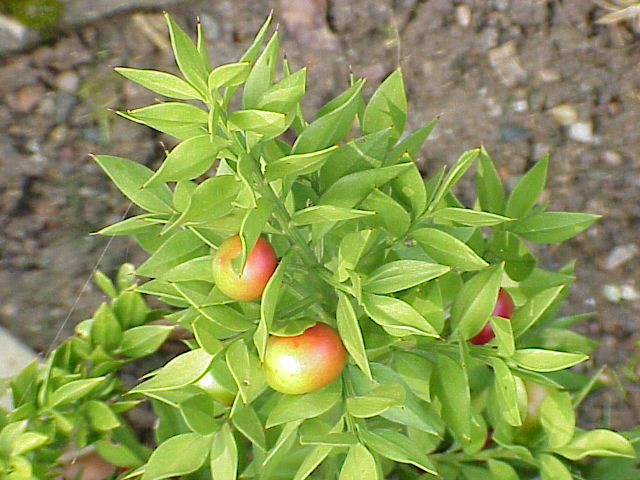
- Ruscus aculeatus

Scientific classification
- Kingdom: Plantae
- Clade: Tracheophytes
- Clade: Angiosperms
- Clade: Monocots
- Order: Asparagales
- Family: Asparagaceae
- Subfamily: Convallarioideae
- Genus: Ruscus; L.

Synonyms
- Hippoglossum Hill; Oxymyrsine Bubani; Platyruscus A.P.Khokhr. & V.N.Tikhom.

= Ruscus =

Genus of flowering plants

Ruscus, commonly known as butcher's-broom, is a genus of six species of flowering plants, native to western and southern Europe, Macaronesia, northwestern Africa, and southwestern Asia east to the Caucasus. In the APG III classification system, it is placed in the family Asparagaceae, subfamily Convallarioideae (formerly the family Ruscaceae). Like many lilioid monocots, it was formerly classified in the family Liliaceae.

The species are evergreen shrub-like perennial plants, growing to approximately 1 metre (3 ft 3 in) tall. They have branched stems that bear numerous cladodes (flattened, leaf-like stem tissue, also known as phylloclades) 2 to 18 centimetres (0.79 to 7.09 in) long and 1 to 8 centimetres (0.39 to 3.15 in) broad. The true leaves are minute, scale-like, and non-photosynthetic. The flowers are small, white with a dark-violet centre, and situated on the middle of the cladodes. The fruit is a red berry 5 to 10 millimetres (0.20 to 0.39 in) in diameter. Some species are monoecious while others are dioecious.

Ruscus is spread by seed and by means of underground rhizomes. It can colonize extensive patches of ground.

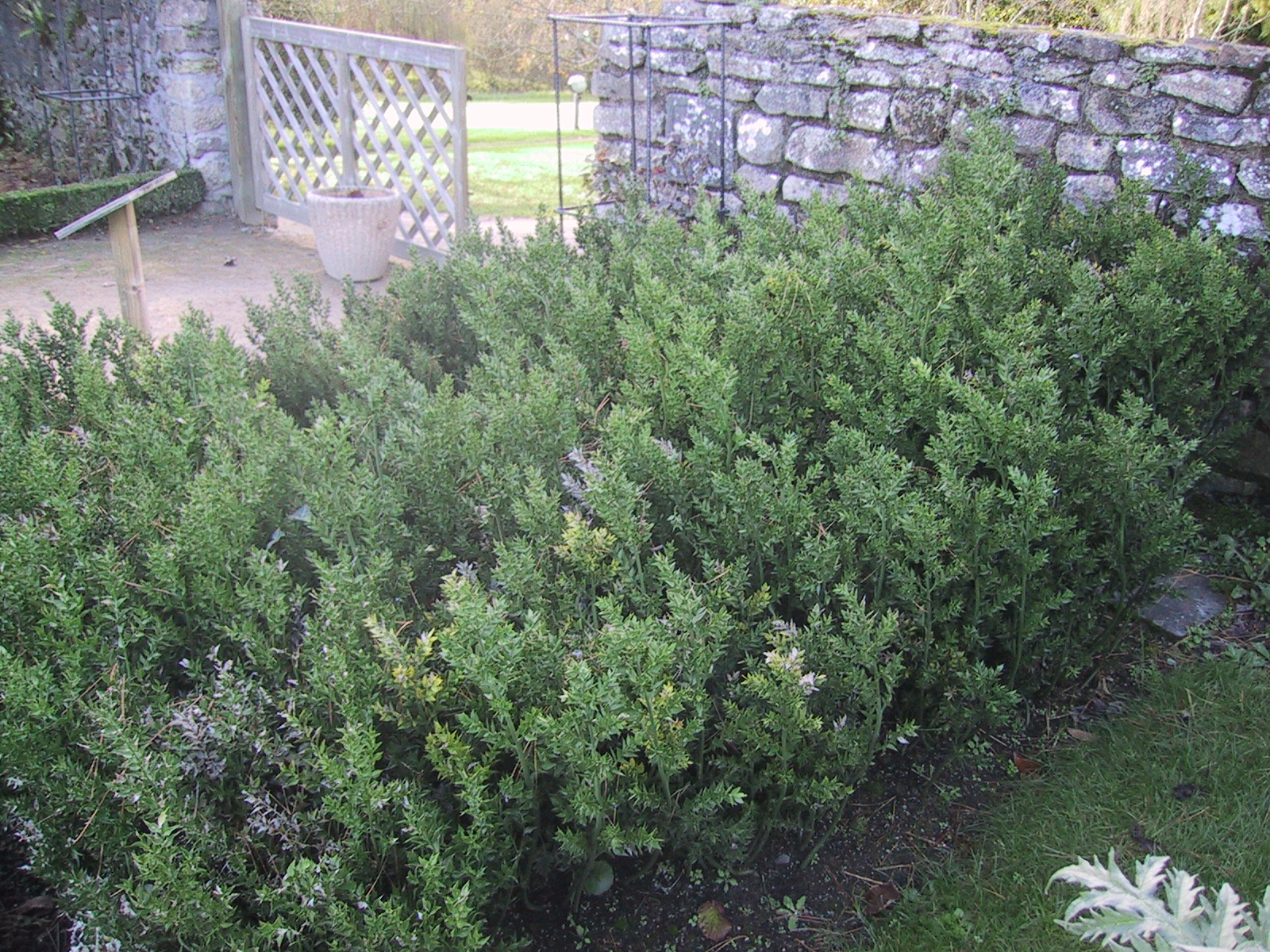
Ruscus aculeatus habit

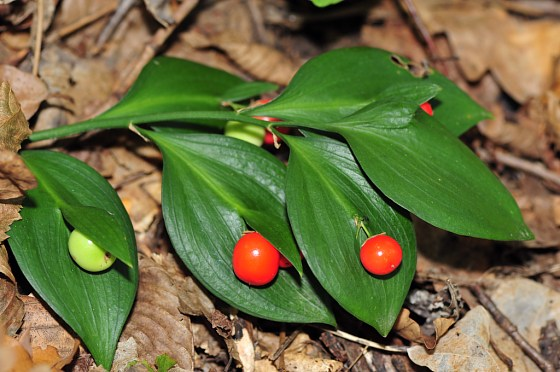
Ruscus hypoglossum

== Species ==
- Ruscus aculeatus (butcher's-broom). Europe, Azores.
- Ruscus colchicus Caucasus.
- Ruscus hypoglossum (spineless butcher's-broom). Central and Southeast Europe, Turkey.
- Ruscus hypophyllum Iberia, northwest Africa. Used in the floral trade as foliage.
- Ruscus hyrcanus Woronow An endemic and relict bush in the Talish Mountains, Azerbaijan. Protected in the Hirkan national Park.
- Ruscus × microglossus Southern Europe.
- Ruscus streptophyllus Madeira.

== Uses ==
=== Medicinal plants ===
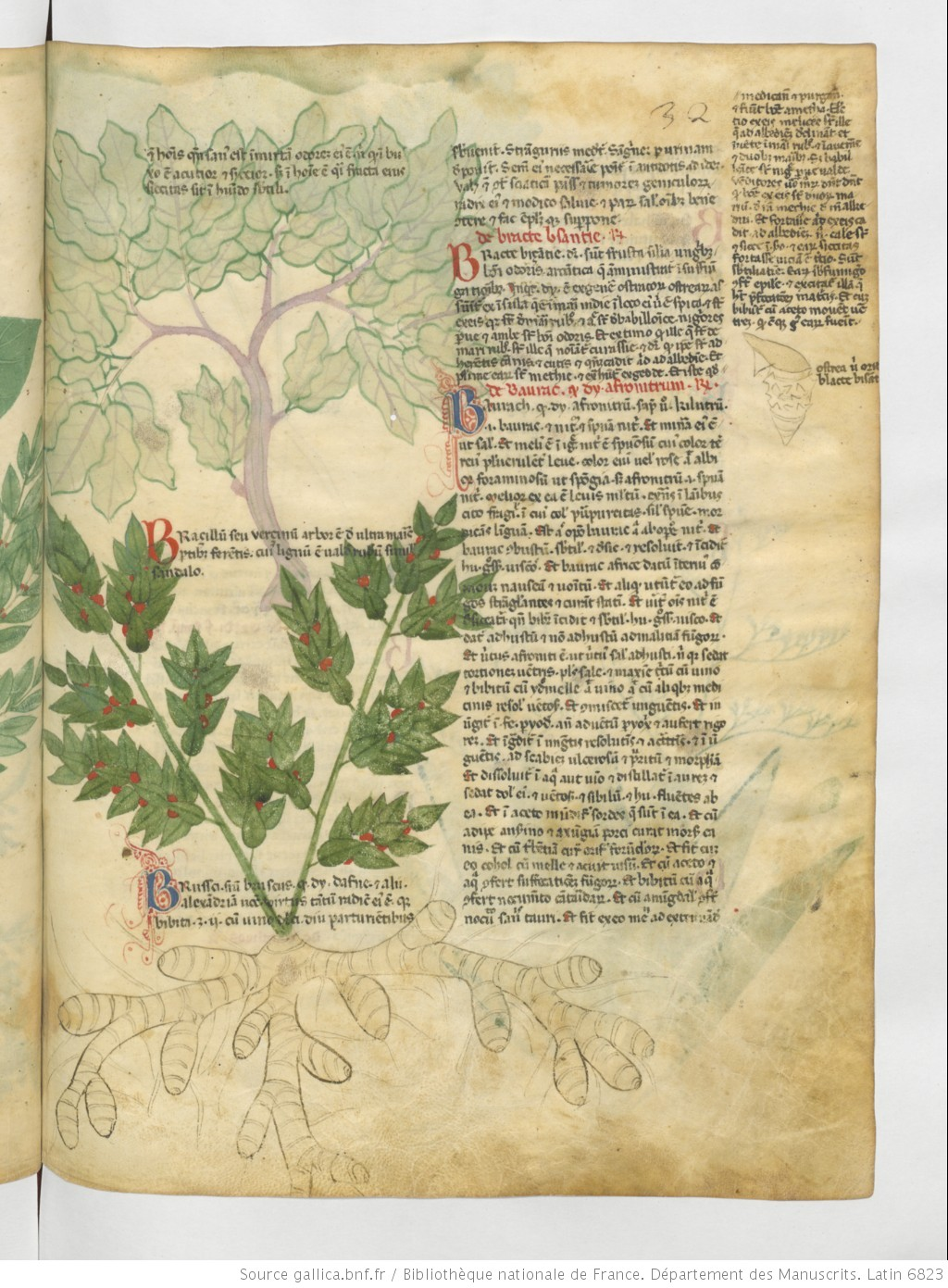
Mouse thorn in Tractatus de herbis, 14th century

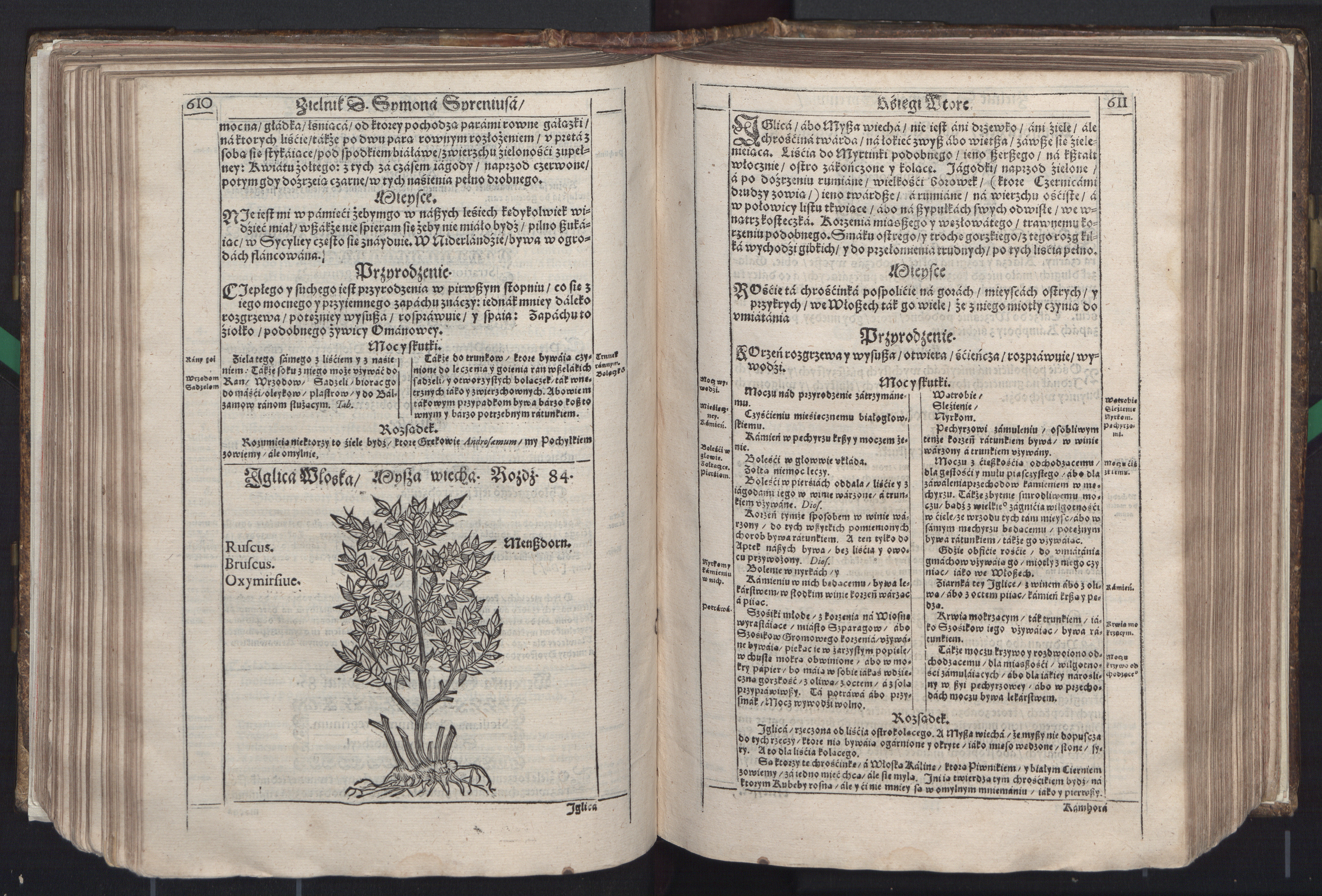
Description of mouse thorn in the Herbal of Syreniusz from 1613

==== History ====
Various species of butcher's-broom have been used for medicinal purposes since antiquity. The first mentions of the medicinal use of the butcher's-broom come from ancient Greece. The rhizomes of this plant were used to treat inflammations, haemorrhoids, and urinary tract conditions, as well as a diuretic and laxative. In the 1st century De Materia Medica by Dioscorides, the plants described are: ύπόγλοσσον (ypoglosson), probably Ruscus hypoglossum, ιδαια ριζα (idaia riza), also probably R. hypoglossum and μυρσίνη άγρία (myrsini agria), probably R. aculeatus. Dioscorides indicated the laxative and diuretic effects of these plants. Pliny the Elder in his Natural History pointed out the use of these plants in treating varicose veins. In the Herbal of Simon Syreński, first published in 1613, the butcher's-broom is described as a plant with healing power, for use in urinary retention, kidney stones, and accelerating menstruation, mainly in the form of a wine tincture. Also, in the 17th-century work Janua linguarum reserata by Comenius, the butcher's-broom was described as a warm herb for kidney diseases. In the 1852 work Special Botany: Description of Monocotyledonous Medicinal and Industrial Plants by Ignacy Czerwiakowski, the author reported that the root of butcher's-broom (radix Rusci v. Brusci) was formerly used as "an opening and diuretic agent in dropsy and blockages of the viscera", part of the herbal mixture radices quinque aperientes majores (five major opening roots), and also used in treating jaundice and kidney stones, and to accelerate menstruation. The author also mentioned that the root of R. hypophyllum had medical applications, including in difficult births, retention of menstruation, and urinary system conditions. In the case of R. hypoglossum, Czerwiakowski mentioned the use of this plant's herb for throat and uterine conditions.

==== Indications ====
Butcher's-broom is used in traditional medicine in many countries around the Mediterranean Sea. In Europe, the underground parts are traditionally used in the treatment of urinary system conditions and as a laxative, while the aboveground parts are mainly used as diuretics. In folk medicine in Turkey, a decoction of the roots of butcher's-broom is widely used internally as a diuretic and for treating urinary system conditions, such as kidney inflammation and kidney stones, as well as for treating eczema. In Palestine, an extract from the rhizome is used externally for skin diseases, while in Italy it is used in treating warts and frostbite, with inflammatory bowel diseases and diarrhea, and topically in joint inflammation. The aboveground parts of the plant are traditionally used as diuretics, mainly in Mediterranean countries and the Middle East. In Turkey, a decoction of the berries of Ruscus hypoglossum is used externally for boils and warts, and fresh leaves are used in cattle breeding against colds and mastitis. The leaves of R. colchicus are used by the local population for feeding farm animals to increase milk production and fat content. Ruscus hyrcanus is used in traditional Iranian medicine as a diuretic, hemostatic, vasoconstrictor, antimicrobial, and anti-inflammatory agent.

==== Current Use ====
Presently, butcher's-broom is not widely used in modern medicine due to a lack of comprehensive clinical studies proving its effectiveness. However, extracts of this plant are found in some pharmaceutical and cosmetic products, such as creams for varicose veins and hemorrhoids. Preparations of the plant are also used in homeopathy. Some recent studies have indicated that the plant may have potential pharmacological effects, such as anti-inflammatory, antimicrobial, and antioxidant activities. These studies suggest the possibility of its future application in modern medicine, especially in diseases related to inflammation and oxidative stress.

=== Culinary ===
In Italy the tender young, 5–20 centimetres (2.0–7.9 in) long, pinkish-white shoots are consumed boiled like asparagus. As of 1997, it has been planned to introduce management measures to protect its overexploitation.

=== Toxicity ===
The Milan Poison Control Centre handled 107 R. aculeatus poisoning cases in the period 1995–2007; subsequently 4 acute poisoning cases were recorded for the 2010–2011 season in Lombardy. The majority of cases were children who had consumed the attractive berries.

Common Ruscus toxins
Compound	EINECS Number	CAS Number	GHS Class (Oral)	Oral LD_{50} (mg/kg)	R. aculeatus (%DW)			R. hypoglossum (%DW)			Sources
Compound	EINECS Number	CAS Number	GHS Class (Oral)	Oral LD_{50} (mg/kg)	Rhizome	Aerial	Fruit	Rhizome	Aerial	Fruit	Sources
Neoruscogenin	241–660–1	17676–33–4	H302	5000	0.173%	?	?	?	?	?	
Ruscogenin	207–447–2	472–11–7	H302	8000	0.111%	0.03-0.05%	?	0.14%	0.10%	?	

== Bibliography ==
- NCBI (2025b). "PubChem Compound Summary for CID 9910474, Neoruscogenin". PubChem.
- NCBI (2025a). "PubChem Compound Summary for CID 441893, Ruscogenin". PubChem.
- Ejiohuo, Ovinuchi; Bajia, Donald; Pawlak, Joanna; Szczepankiewicz, Aleksandra (2025-03-17). "In silico identification of novel ligands targeting stress-related human FKBP5 protein in mental disorders". PLOS ONE. 20 (3) e0320017. Bibcode:2025PLoSO..2020017E. doi:10.1371/journal.pone.0320017. eISSN 1932-6203. PMC 11913304.
- Chemicalbook (2025b). "Ruscogenin Chemical Safety Data Sheet MSDS / SDS". ChemicalBook.
- Chemicalbook (2025a). "Neoruscogenin Chemical Safety Data Sheet MSDS / SDS". ChemicalBook.
- Masullo, Milena; Pizza, Cosimo; Piacente, Sonia (2016). "Ruscus Genus: A Rich Source of Bioactive Steroidal Saponins" (PDF). Planta Medica. 82 (18): 1513–1524. Bibcode:2016PlMed..82.1513M. doi:10.1055/s-0042-119728. eISSN 1439-0221. PMID 27825178.
- Banfi, Enrico; Colombo, Maria Laura; Davanzo, Franca; Falciola, Chiara; Galasso, Gabriele; Martino, Emanuela; Perego, Sandro (2012). "Piante velenose della flora italiana nell'esperienza del Centro Antiveleni di Milano" [Poisonous Plants of the Italian Flora in the Experience of the Milan Poison Control Centre] (PDF). Natura: Rivista di Scienze Naturali (in Italian). 102 (1). ISSN 0369-6243.
- Vlase, Laurian; Kiss, Béla; Balica, Georgeta; Tămas, Mircea; Crisan, Gianina; Leucuta, Sorin E. (2009). "High-Throughput LC/MS/MS Analysis of Ruscogenin and Neoruscogenin in Ruscus aculeatus L". Journal of AOAC International. 92 (4): 1055–1059. doi:10.1093/jaoac/92.4.1055. eISSN 1944-7922. PMID 19714971.
- Tansi, Sezen; Kokdil, G.; Karaman, S.; Toncer, Ozlem; Yilmaz, H. (2007). "Variation in ruscogenin contents in Ruscus aculeatus L. growing wild in Southern Turkey". Asian Journal of Chemistry. 19 (4): 3015–3022. eISSN 0975-427X.
