= Michael Rohde (botanist) =

German physician and botanist

Michael Rohde was a German physician and botanist. He was born on 25 July 1782, in Bremen, and died there on 28 May 1812.

From 1800 to 1804 he studied natural sciences and medicine at the University of Göttingen. Following graduation, he was engaged in travels for several years in southern Germany, Austria and France. In 1809 he started a medical practice in Bremen, where he died three years later, aged 29.

In 1804 he published Monographiae Cinchonae generis tentamen. The plant genus Rohdea is named after Rohde.

== Sources and references ==
- John Hendley Barnhart (1965). Biographical Notes upon Botanists. G.K. Hall & Co. (Boston).
