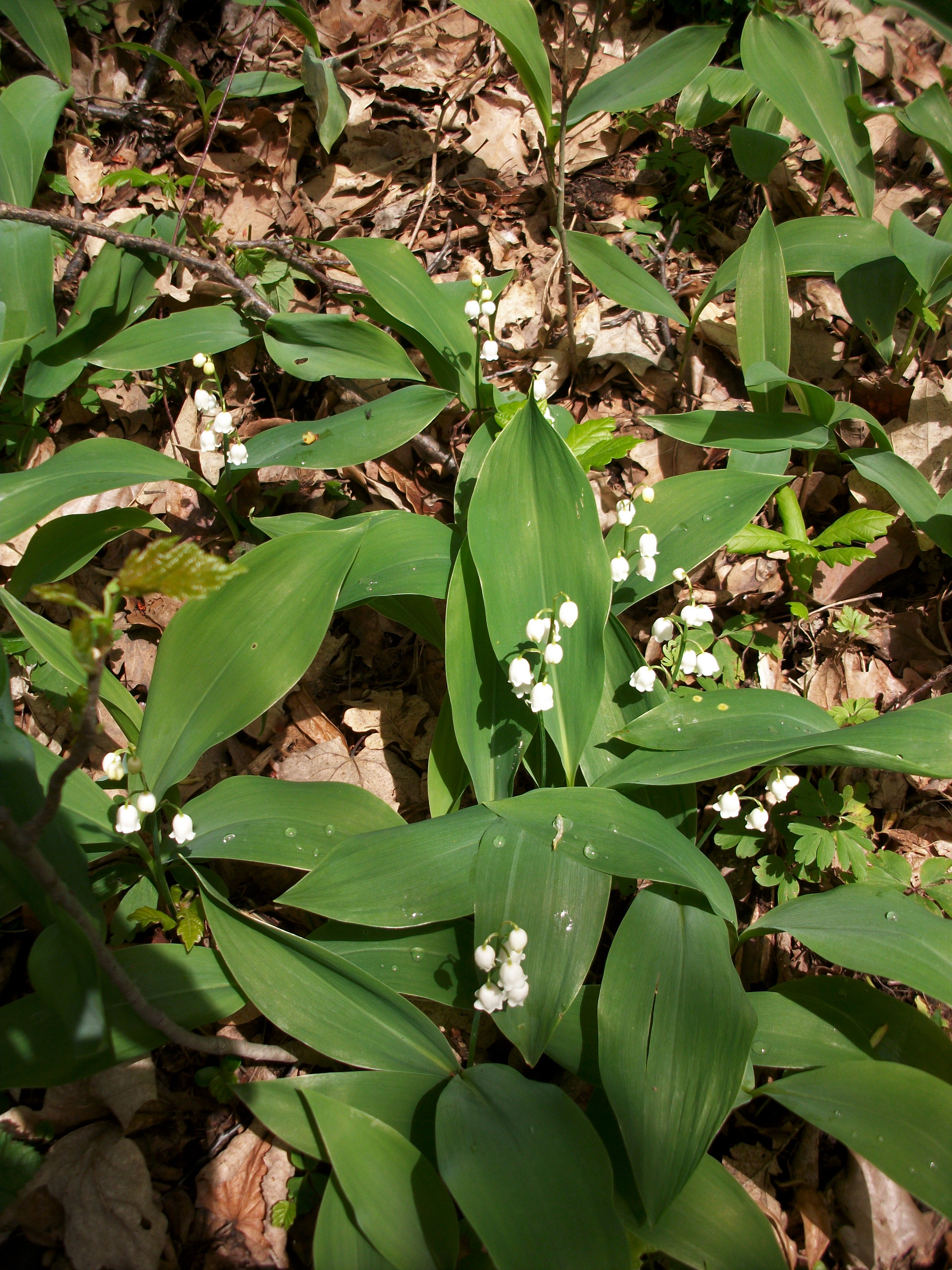
- Convallaria majalis, the type species of the Convallarioideae

Scientific classification
- Kingdom: Plantae
- Clade: Tracheophytes
- Clade: Angiosperms
- Clade: Monocots
- Order: Asparagales
- Family: Asparagaceae
- Subfamily: Convallarioideae; Herb.

Genera
- See text

= Convallarioideae =

Subfamily of flowering plants

Convallarioideae is a monocot subfamily of the family Asparagaceae. It used to be treated as a separate family, Ruscaceae s.l., but this family was merged into Asparagaceae in the APG III system of 2009. Initially the name Nolinoideae was used, derived from the type genus Nolina. This name was supposed to have been published by Burnett in 1935. However, this has been shown to be an error, as Burnett based a subfamily on the Solanaceae genus Nolana not Nolina.

The subfamily includes genera that had been placed in a range of different families, including Ruscaceae s.s., Nolinaceae, Dracaenaceae, Convallariaceae and Eriospermaceae. Like many groups of lilioid monocots, the genera included here were once included in a wide interpretation of the family Liliaceae.

== Taxonomy ==
In the 2009 APG III system, the former family Ruscaceae was one of those sunk into a much broader family Asparagaceae. As a result, Chase and coauthors proposed a set of subfamilies for the Asparagaceae in 2009, including one they called Nolinoideae, supposedly published by Burnett in 1835 based on the genus Nolina. Many authors have subsequently used this name. However, in 2023, it was pointed out that Burnett actually published a subfamily Nolanoideae within the family Solanaceae, based on the genus Nolana. The earliest published and hence correct name for the subfamily thus becomes Convallarioideae, based on the genus Convallaria, published by William Herbert in 1837, a conclusion supported by the Angiosperm Phylogeny Website as of August 2025.

=== Genera ===
A possibly incomplete list of the genera included in the Convallarioideae (former Nolinoideae) is given below. The reference is to the source which places the genus in this subfamily. The genera included here have varied widely in their limits and assignment to families and subfamilies; some former family placements other than Convallarioideae (which will be found in the literature) are given below.

| Genus | Source | Tribe | Former family placement(s) other than Ruscaceae s.l. |
| Aspidistra Ker Gawl. (including Antherolophus Gagnep., Colania Gagnep.) | | Convallarieae | Convallariaceae |
| Beaucarnea Lem. | | Nolineae | Dracaenaceae, Agavaceae |
| Comospermum Rauschert | | ? | Anthericaceae |
| Convallaria L. | | Convallarieae | Convallariaceae |
| Danae Medik. | | Rusceae |
| Dasylirion Zucc. | | Nolineae | Dracaenaceae |
| Disporopsis Hance | | Polygonateae | Convallariaceae |
| Dracaena Vand. ex L. (including Sansevieria Thunb.) | | Dracaeneae | Dracaenaceae, Agavaceae |
| Eriospermum Jacq. | | Eriospermeae | Eriospermaceae |
| Heteropolygonatum M.N.Tamura & Ogisu | | Polygonateae | Convallariaceae |
| Liriope Lour. | | Ophiopogoneae | Convallariaceae |
| Maianthemum F.H.Wigg. (including Oligobotrya Baker, Smilacina Desf.) | | Polygonateae | Convallariaceae |
| Nolina Michx. | | Nolineae | Dracaenaceae |
| Ophiopogon Ker Gawl. | | Ophiopogoneae | Convallariaceae |
| Peliosanthes Andrews | | Ophiopogoneae | Convallariaceae |
| Polygonatum Mill. | | Polygonateae | Convallariaceae |
| Reineckea Kunth | | Convallarieae | Convallariaceae |
| Rohdea Roth (including Gonioscypha Baker) | | Convallarieae | Convallariaceae |
| Ruscus L. | | Rusceae |
| Semele Kunth | | Rusceae |
| Speirantha Baker | | Convallarieae | Convallariaceae |
| Theropogon Maxim. | | ? | Convallariaceae |
| Tupistra Ker Gawl. (including Campylandra Baker, Tricalistra Ridl.) | | Convallarieae | Convallariaceae |

=== Genera formerly placed in this subfamily ===
Calibanus was a former genus that was placed in this subfamily when the APG III system was introduced. Both members of the genus have since been transferred to the genus Beaucarnea (also a member of the subfamily) after molecular phylogenetic research demonstrated a strong phylogenetic relationship with species of Beaucarnea.
