= Pleomele (genus) =

Former genus of flowering plants

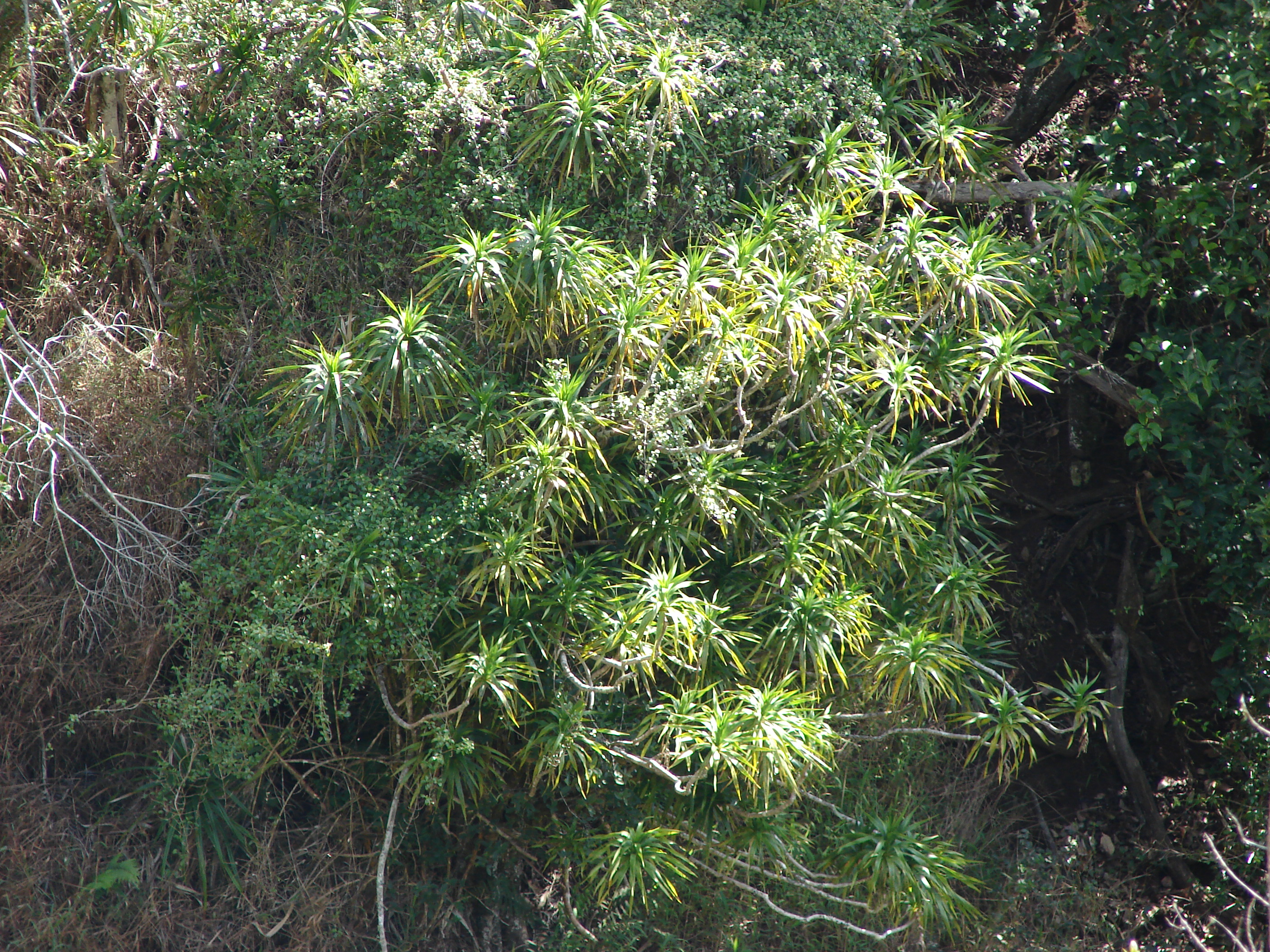
Dracaena fernaldii, syn. Pleomele fernaldii

Pleomele is a former genus of flowering plants. All its species are now placed in the genus Dracaena. The Hawaiian name for plants in this genus is hala pepe, which translates to crushed or dwarfed Pandanus tectorius.

== Former species ==
- Pleomele angustifolia (Medik.) N.E.Br. = Dracaena angustifolia
- Pleomele atropurpurea (Roxb.) N.E.Br. = Dracaena elliptica
- Pleomele aurea H.Mann – golden hala pepe (Kauaʻi) = Dracaena aurea
- Pleomele australasica Ridl. = Dracaena angustifolia
- Pleomele auwahiensis H.St.John – Maui Nui hala pepe (Maui, Molokaʻi) = Dracaena rockii
- Pleomele elliptica (Thunb. & Dalm.) N.E.Br. = Dracaena elliptica
- Pleomele fernaldii H.St.John – Lānaʻi hala pepe (Lānaʻi) = Dracaena fernaldii
- Pleomele flexuosa (Blume) N.E.Br. = Dracaena angustifolia
- Pleomele forbesii O.Deg. – Waiʻanae hala pepe (Oʻahu) = Dracaena forbesii
- Pleomele fruticosa (K.Koch) N.E.Br. =Dracaena angustifolia
- Pleomele gracilis (Baker) N.E.Br. = Dracaena elliptica
- Pleomele halapepe H.St.John – Oʻahu hala pepe (Oʻahu) = Dracaena halapepe
- Pleomele hawaiiensis O.Deg. & I.Deg – Hawaiʻi hala pepe (Island of Hawaiʻi) = Dracaena konaensis

== Uses ==
=== Medicinal ===
Native Hawaiians combined the bark and leaves of hala pepe with the root bark of ʻuhaloa (Waltheria indica) and popolo (Solanum americanum), and a section of kō kea (Saccharum officinarum) to treat high fever and chills. Hala pepe bark, roots, and leaves were combined with ʻōhiʻa ʻai (Syzygium malaccense) bark, ʻuhaloa and popolo taproot bark, ʻalaʻala wai nui pehu (Peperomia spp.) stems, noni (Morinda citrifolia) fruit, kō kea, niu (coconuts, Cocos nucifera), and pia (Tacca leontopetaloides) to treat lung disorders.

=== Non-medicinal ===
The soft wood of the trunk was carved by Native Hawaiians into kiʻi. Hala pepe represented the goddess Kapo on the kuahu (altar) within a hālau hula (building which hula was taught or performed). It along with ʻieʻie (Freycinetia arborea), maile (Alyxia oliviformis), ʻōhiʻa lehua (Metrosideros polymorpha) and palapalai (Microlepia strigosa) were the five essential plants at the hula altar.
