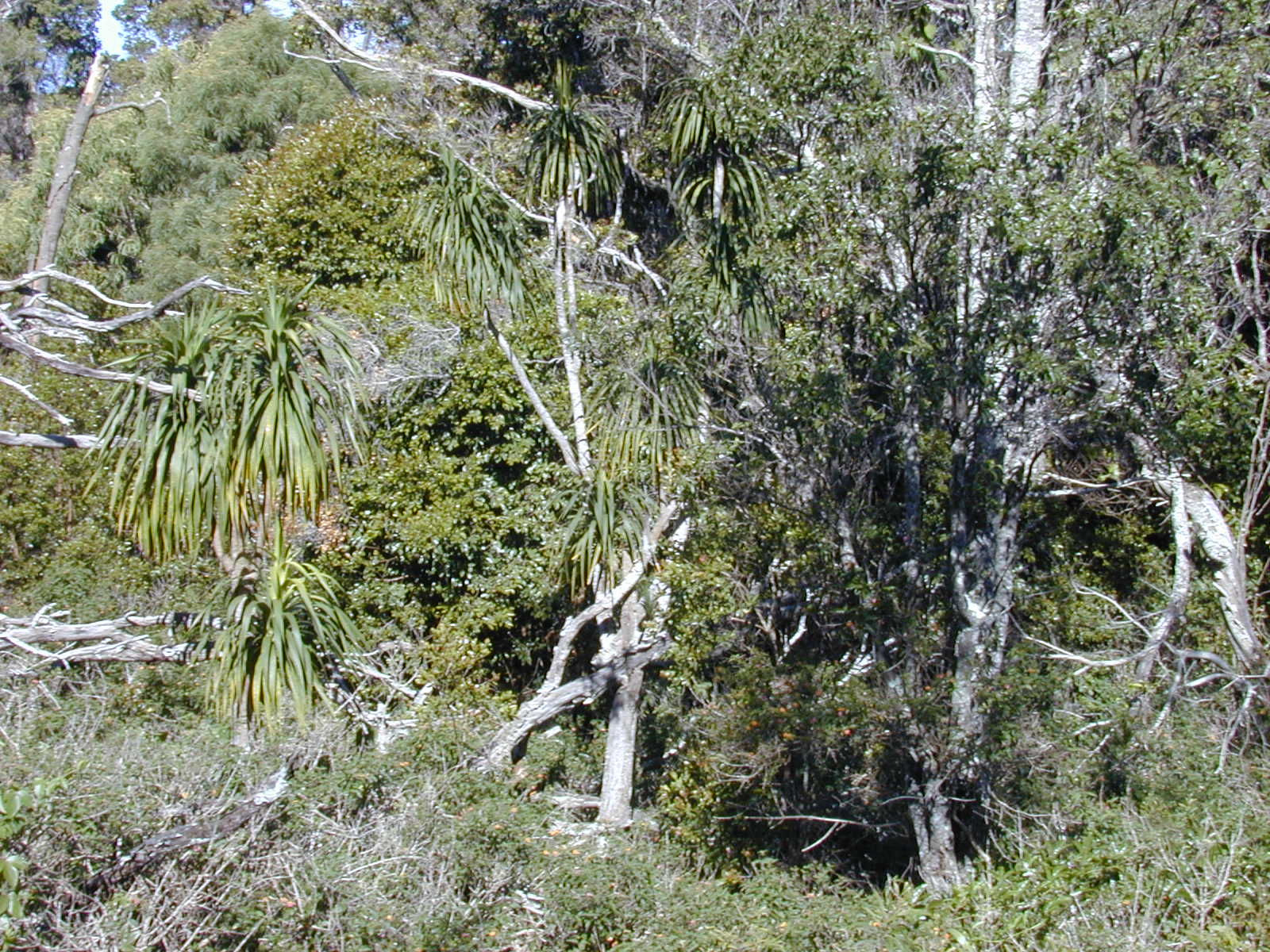

Conservation status
- Endangered (IUCN 3.1)

- Imperiled (NatureServe)

Scientific classification
- Kingdom: Plantae
- Clade: Tracheophytes
- Clade: Angiosperms
- Clade: Monocots
- Order: Asparagales
- Family: Asparagaceae
- Subfamily: Convallarioideae
- Genus: Dracaena
- Species: D. aurea

Binomial name
- Dracaena aurea H.Mann

Synonyms
- Draco aurea (H.Mann) Kuntze; Pleomele aurea (H.Mann) N.E.Br.; Chrysodracon aurea (H.Mann) P.L.Lu & Morden

= Dracaena aurea =

Species of tree

Dracaena aurea, the golden hala pepe, is a species of flowering plant that is endemic to the island of Kauaʻi in Hawaii. It inhabits coastal mesic and mixed mesic forests at elevations of 120–1,070 m (390–3,510 ft). It is a small evergreen tree, usually 4.6–7.6 m (15–25 ft) tall, but sometimes reaches 12 m (39 ft). The gray, straight trunk does not have bark and is 0.3–0.9 m (0.98–2.95 ft) in diameter. The sword-shaped leaves are 20–51 cm (7.9–20.1 in) long and 1–3 cm (0.39–1.18 in) wide.

It was first described by Horace Mann Jr. as Dracaena aurea in 1867. In 1914, N. E. Brown moved it to the genus Pleomele. Later, in 2014 it was moved to Chrysodracon as the type species of this new, Hawaiian endemic genus, which is now included within Dracaena.
