= Pleomele =

Pleomele is used a common name for several cultivated ornamental plants and may refer to:

- Species of Pleomele (genus), a former plant genus in the family Ruscaceae now included in Dracaena
- Dracaena reflexa (pleomele), a widely cultivated plant previously classified in the genus Pleomele
