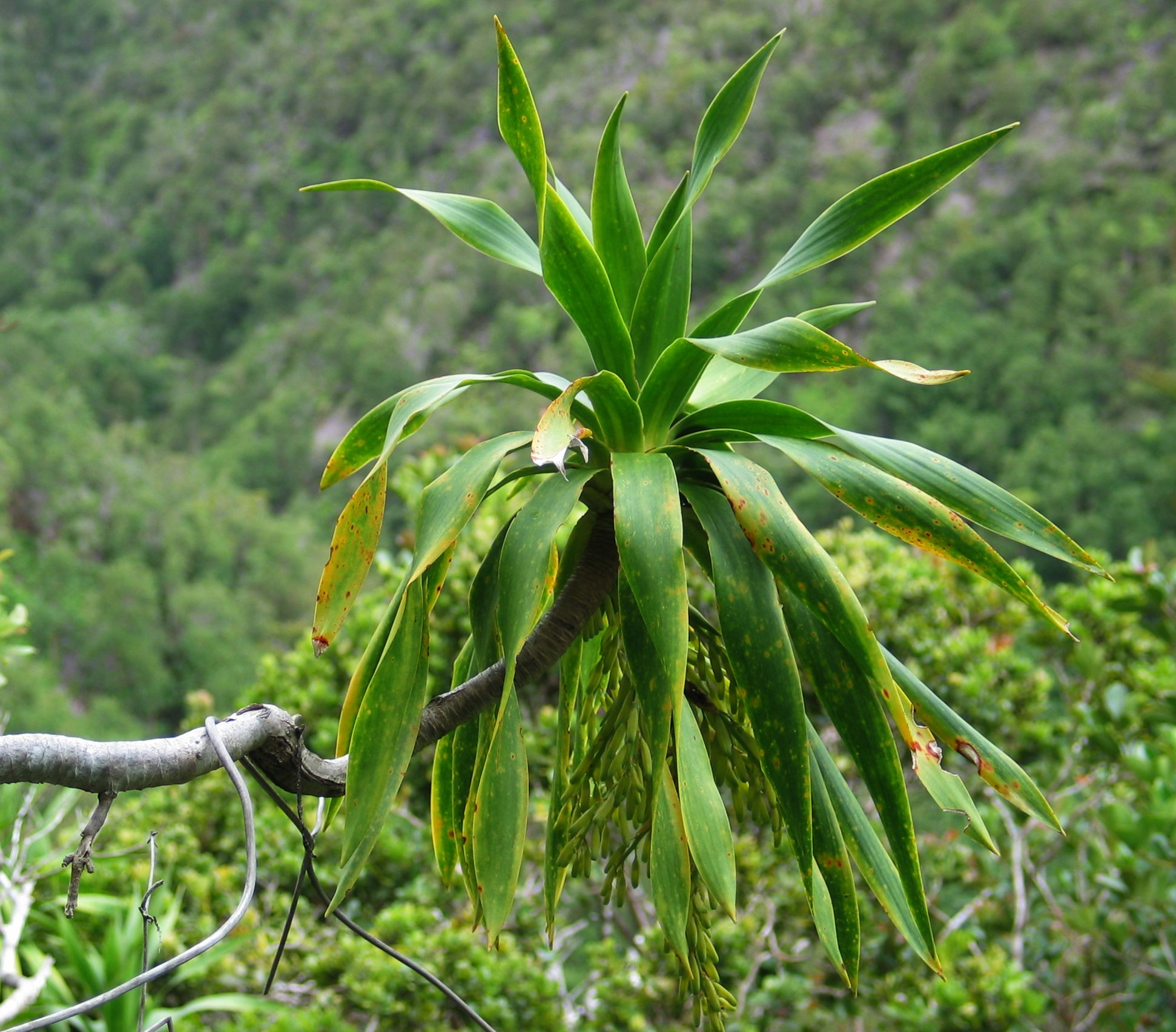

Conservation status
- Endangered (IUCN 2.3)

- Critically Imperiled (NatureServe)

Scientific classification
- Kingdom: Plantae
- Clade: Tracheophytes
- Clade: Angiosperms
- Clade: Monocots
- Order: Asparagales
- Family: Asparagaceae
- Subfamily: Convallarioideae
- Genus: Dracaena
- Species: D. fernaldii

Binomial name
- Dracaena fernaldii (H.St.John) Jankalski

Synonyms
- Chrysodracon fernaldii (H.St.John) P.L.Lu & Morden; Dracaena hawaiiensis Fosberg; Pleomele fernaldii H.St.John

= Dracaena fernaldii =

Species of tree

Dracaena fernaldii, synonym Pleomele fernaldii, is a species of flowering plant that is endemic to the island of Lānaʻi in Hawaiʻi. It is known by the common name Lanai hala pepe. It can be found in dry forests at elevations of 490–670 metres (1,610–2,200 ft). It is threatened by habitat loss. 400–1000 of these plants remain in the wild, but little recruitment has been observed in the past 10 years. The reasons for the lack of recruitment are unclear.

This is a federally listed endangered species of the United States.
