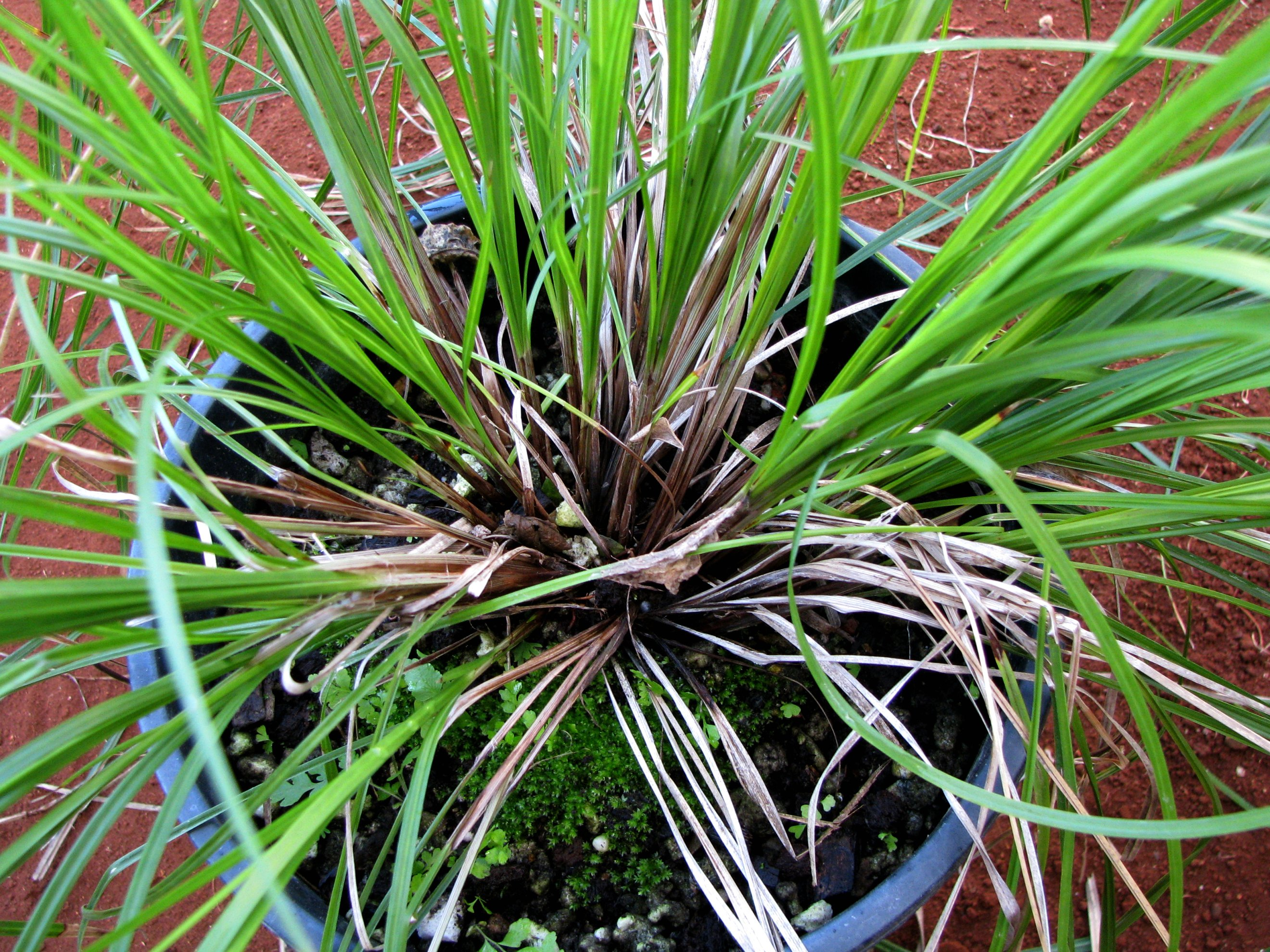

Scientific classification
- Kingdom: Plantae
- Clade: Tracheophytes
- Clade: Angiosperms
- Clade: Monocots
- Clade: Commelinids
- Order: Poales
- Family: Cyperaceae
- Genus: Carex
- Species: C. meyenii

Binomial name
- Carex meyenii Nees

= Carex meyenii =

Species of sedge

Carex meyenii, commonly known as Meyen's sedge, is a tussock-forming species of perennial sedge in the family Cyperaceae. It is native to parts of Hawaii.

Th species was first described by the botanist Christian Gottfried Daniel Nees von Esenbeck in 1841 as published in Cyperaceae . It has two synonyms; Carex remyi and Carex brunnea var. meyenii. The type specimen was collected in 1831 by Franz Julius Ferdinand Meyen on the island of Oahu.

== See also ==
- List of Carex species
