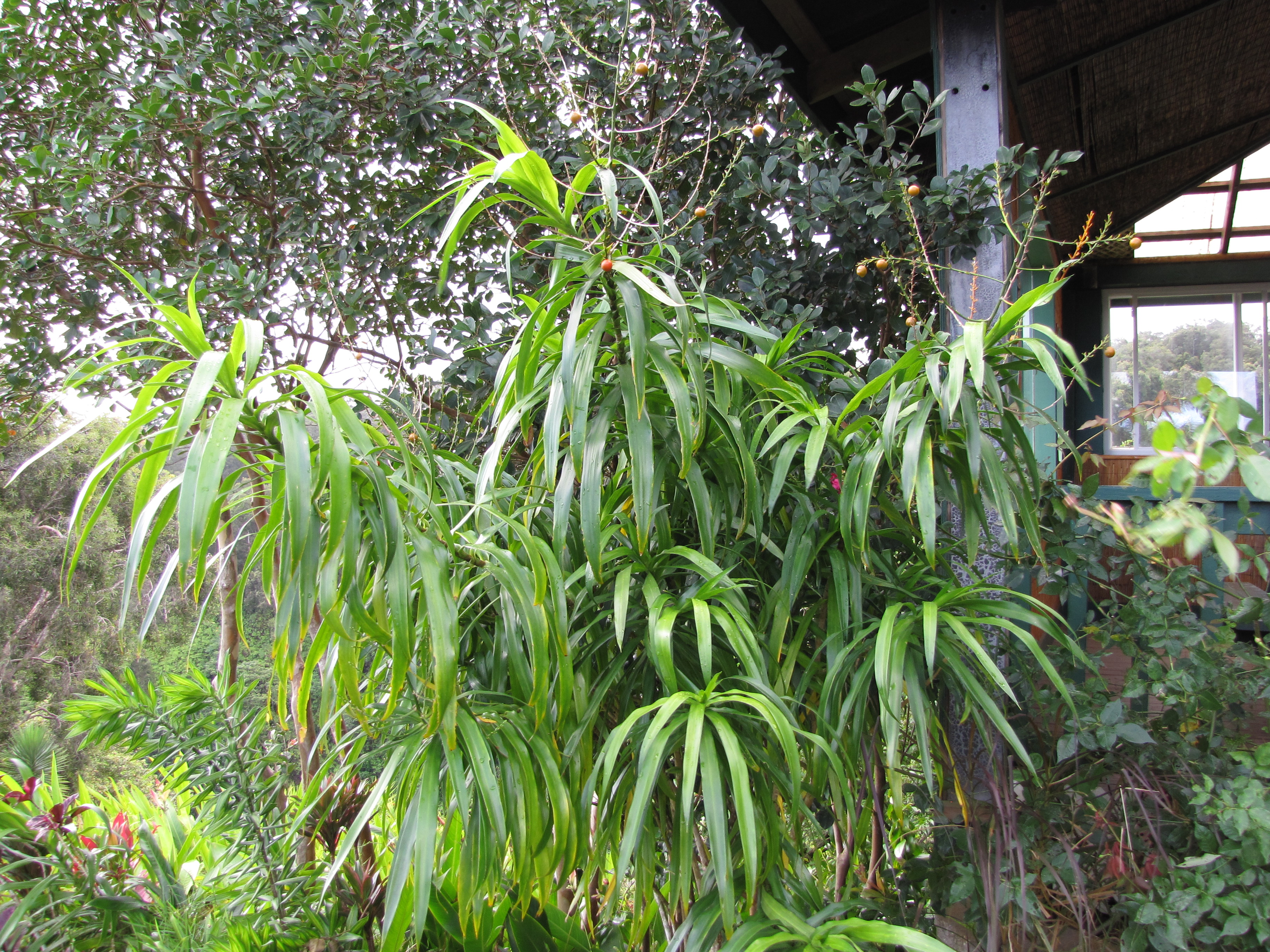

Scientific classification
- Kingdom: Plantae
- Clade: Tracheophytes
- Clade: Angiosperms
- Clade: Monocots
- Order: Asparagales
- Family: Asparagaceae
- Subfamily: Convallarioideae
- Genus: Dracaena
- Species: D. angustifolia

Binomial name
- Dracaena angustifolia (Medik.) Roxb.

Synonyms
- 29 synonyms: Cordyline rumphii Hook.; Dracaena rumphii (Hook.) B.S.Williams nom. superfl.; Draco angustifolia (Medik.) Kuntze; Pleomele angustifolia (Medik.) N.E.Br.; Pleomele reflexa var. angustifolia (Medik.) M.R.Almeida; Sansevieria fruticosa Blume nom. illeg.; Terminalis angustifolia Medik.; Cordyline fruticosa Göpp. nom. nud.; Dracaena angustifolia var. angustior (Ridl.) Jankalski; Dracaena angustifolia var. honoriae F.M.Bailey; Dracaena atropurpurea var. kurzii Baker; Dracaena australasica (Ridl.) Jankalski nom. illeg.; Dracaena australasica Mast.; Dracaena brachyphylla Kurz; Dracaena ensiformis Wall. ex Voigt nom. nud.; Dracaena fruticosa Regel nom. illeg.; Dracaena fruticosa (Blume) K.Koch; Dracaena linearifolia Kurz; Dracaena menglaensis G.Z.Ye; Dracaena quitensis Baker; Draco fruticosa (Blume) Kuntze; Pleomele angustifolia var. angustior Ridl.; Pleomele australasica Ridl.; Pleomele brachyphylla (Kurz) N.E.Br.; Pleomele flexuosa (Blume) N.E.Br.; Pleomele fruticosa (Blume) N.E.Br.; Sansevieria flexuosa Blume; Sansevieria fruticosa Blume; Pandanus inermis Blanco nom. illeg.

= Dracaena angustifolia =

Species of plant

Dracaena angustifolia is a species of Asian tropical forest under-storey plants in the family Asparagaceae; no subspecies are listed in the Catalogue of Life.

== Distribution and Description ==
The native range of this species is from Bangladesh, through Indo-China and Malesia to northern Australia. In Vietnam the plant may be called phất dủ lá hẹp.

Dracaena angustifolia is a shrub, up to 3 m high, with leaves 150-250 x 20-30 mm wide. The yellowish flowers are about 20 mm long.

== Uses ==
The leaves of this plant are used as a natural green food colourant.
