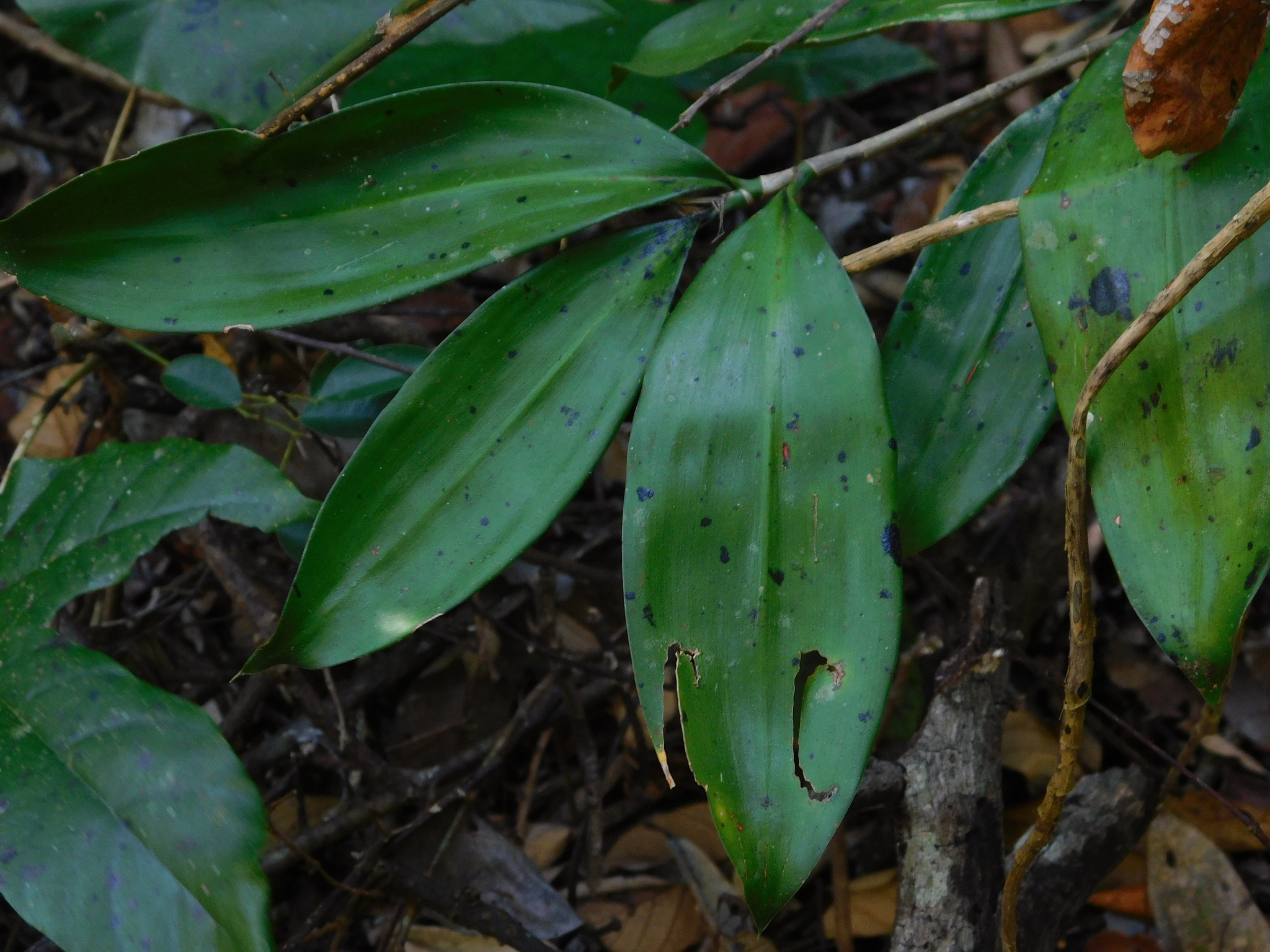

Scientific classification
- Kingdom: Plantae
- Clade: Tracheophytes
- Clade: Angiosperms
- Clade: Monocots
- Order: Asparagales
- Family: Asparagaceae
- Subfamily: Convallarioideae
- Genus: Dracaena
- Species: D. elliptica

Binomial name
- Dracaena elliptica Thunb. & Dalm.

Synonyms
- List: Sansevieria javanica Blume Pleomele gracilis (Baker) N.E.Br. Pleomele elliptica (Thunb. & Dalm.) N.E.Br. Pleomele atropurpurea (Roxb.) N.E.Br. Draco elliptica (Thunb. & Dalm.) Kuntze Draco atropurpurea (Roxb.) Kuntze Dracaena sieboldii Planch. Dracaena maculata Roxb. Dracaena javanica var. maculata Dracaena javanica (Blume) Kunth Dracaena gracilis (Baker) Wall. ex Hook.f. Dracaena elliptica var. maculata Dracaena elliptica var. gracilis Dracaena atropurpurea var. kurzii Dracaena atropurpurea var. gracilis Dracaena atropurpurea Roxb. Cordyline sieboldii Planch. Cordyline maculata (Roxb.) Planch. Cordyline atropurpurea (Roxb.) Planch. Calodracon sieboldii Planch.

= Dracaena elliptica =

Species of flowering plant

Dracaena elliptica is a species of Asian tropical forest under-storey plants in the family Asparagaceae; no subspecies are listed in the Catalogue of Life.

== Distribution and description ==
The native range of this species is the Andaman Islands, Assam, Bangladesh, through southern China, Indo-China and western Malesia. In Vietnam the plant may be called phát dủ bầu dục (or phất dủ mảnh as D. gracilis).

D. elliptica is a shrub, up to 2 metres (6.6 ft) high, with elliptic lanceolate leaves 20–30 centimetres (8–12 in) long. The yellow berries are about 10 millimetres (0.39 in) in diameter.
