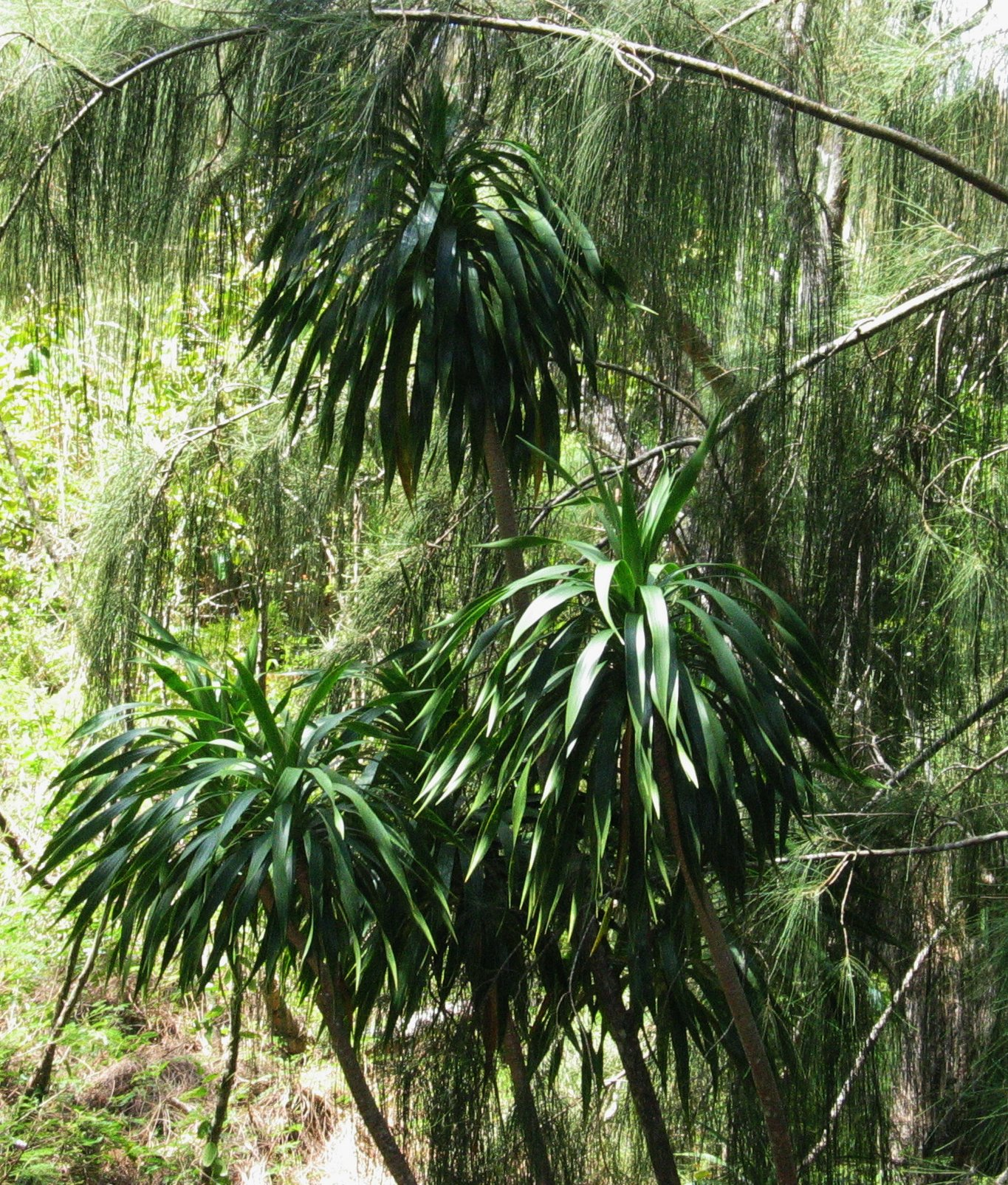

Conservation status
- Vulnerable (IUCN 2.3)

Scientific classification
- Kingdom: Plantae
- Clade: Tracheophytes
- Clade: Angiosperms
- Clade: Monocots
- Order: Asparagales
- Family: Asparagaceae
- Subfamily: Convallarioideae
- Genus: Dracaena
- Species: D. halapepe

Binomial name
- Dracaena halapepe (H.St.John) Jankalski

Synonyms
- Chrysodracon halapepe (H.St.John) P.L.Lu & Morden; Pleomele halapepe H.St.John

= Dracaena halapepe =

Species of flowering plant

Dracaena halapepe, synonym Pleomele halapepe, the royal hala pepe, is a species of flowering plant that is endemic to the island of Oʻahu in Hawaiʻi. It inhabits dry, coastal mesic and mixed mesic forests at elevations of 180–610 metres (590–2,000 ft). It is threatened by habitat loss.

D. halapepe inhabits dry, coastal mesic and mixed mesic forests at elevations between 180 and 610 meters (590–2,000 feet) and is threatened by habitat loss. This paper expands upon that foundation by providing a detailed description of Dracaena halapepe's anatomy and morphology, including its long, narrow leaves, branching form, and reproductive structures. It also explores the plant's limited distribution, noting that it typically grows at elevations of 300–850 meters in specific forest zones on Oʻahu. Beyond its biological features, the paper highlights the species' cultural and spiritual significance in Hawaiian tradition, where it has been used in ceremonial practices and recognized for its symbolic value. Conservation concerns are also discussed, with an emphasis on the role of habitat degradation, invasive species, and the need for restoration efforts to ensure the long-term survival of this ecologically and culturally important native tree.

== Description ==
Dracaena halapepe is a small to medium-sized tree that typically reaches between 15–30 ft (4.6–9.1 m) in height. It has a tall, sparsely branched trunk with clusters of narrow, strap-like leaves that grow at the tips of its branches. The leaves vary from dark to medium green and have a coarse texture. The tree produces clusters of fragrant, yellow flowers on long, arching stalks, followed by small red fruits that resemble berries as they ripen. This species grows slowly to moderately but has a long lifespan, often exceeding five years. It is highly tolerant of dry conditions and thrives in environments with full sunlight and well-drained soils. The plant often develops multiple stems from its base and is appreciated for its neat, architectural appearance, making it a popular choice in native landscaping.

== Distribution and habitat ==
Endemic to Oʻahu, Dracaena halapepe is primarily found on the leeward slopes of the Waiʻanae Mountains, though it has also been reported in the Koʻolau range. It inhabits dry to mesic forests at elevations between 300–850 m (980–2,790 ft), preferring areas with moderate rainfall, full sun, and well-drained rocky or cinder soils. This species typically grows in open-canopy forest systems alongside native plants such as ʻōhiʻa (Metrosideros polymorpha), lama (Diospyros sandwicensis), alaheʻe (Psydrax odorata), and naio (Myoporum sandwicense). Adapted to withstand drought and wind, D. halapepe is well suited to Hawaiʻi's dry forest ecosystems. However, due to habitat degradation, invasive species, and urban encroachment, its natural populations have declined, leading to its designation as a species of conservation concern.

== Human use and cultural significance ==
Dracaena halapepe has long been recognized for its cultural significance in Hawaiian tradition. Its physical resemblance to the hala tree (Pandanus tectorius) inspired its name, "hala pepe," meaning "baby hala". It played a sacred role in hula, where its branches were placed on the kuahu (altar) to honor the goddess Kapo, a deity associated with hula and healing.

The plant also held value in traditional Hawaiian medicine (lāʻau lapaʻau). Its leaves, bark, and roots were used to treat ailments such as asthma, fever, headaches, chills (liʻa), and general body discomfort. The leaves were commonly added to steam baths for their healing properties. In addition to its medicinal and spiritual uses, hala pepe's soft wood was used to carve religious idols and decorate altars. Though these practices are less common today, hala pepe continues to be an important symbol of Hawaiian heritage. It is now cultivated in native plant gardens and valued in landscaping for its beauty, drought tolerance, and cultural relevance.
