= Cabbage (disambiguation) =

Cabbage is a leafy vegetable, derived from the species Brassica oleracea.

Cabbage may also refer to:

== Plants ==
- Bok choy, sometimes referred to as Chinese cabbage
- Chinese cabbage, a similar leafy vegetable, derived from the species Brassica rapa
- Cordyline australis, a cabbage tree from New Zealand

== Arts, entertainment, and media ==
- Cabbage (band), a rock band from Manchester, UK
- "Cabbage" (folk song), a Chinese folk song
- Cabbage (Gaelic Storm album) (2010)
- Cabbage (Super Junky Monkey album)
- Cabbage (video game), a video game prototype once in development at Nintendo.

== Other uses ==
- Cabbage car, a type of control railcar used in the United States
- Cabbage, a slang term for Federal Reserve Notes, cash, or money in the United States of America
- Wesley Correira (born 1978), nicknamed Cabbage, American mixed martial arts fighter
- Trey Cabbage (born 1997), American baseball player

== See also ==
- Cabbage patch (disambiguation)
- Cabbage Patch Kids, American doll brand
- CABG, an abbreviation for coronary artery bypass graft surgery
