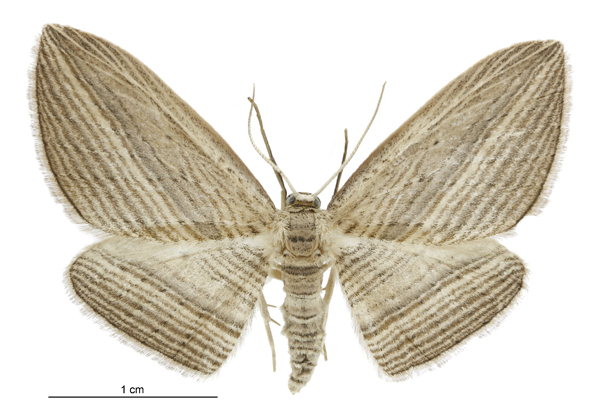
- Female
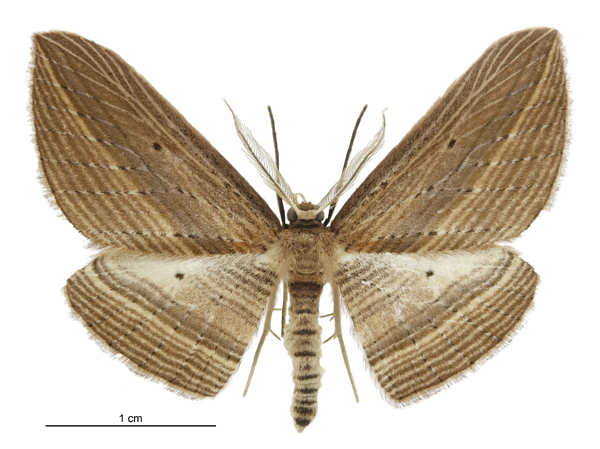
- Male

Scientific classification
- Kingdom: Animalia
- Phylum: Arthropoda
- Clade: Pancrustacea
- Class: Insecta
- Order: Lepidoptera
- Family: Geometridae
- Genus: Epiphryne
- Species: E. verriculata

Binomial name
- Epiphryne verriculata (Felder & Rogenhofer, 1875)

Synonyms
- Synonymy: Cidaria verriculata Felder & Rogenhofer, 1875; Panopoea verriculata (Felder & Rogenhofer 1875); Pancyma verriculata (Felder & Rogenhofer 1875); Venusia verriculata (Felder & Rogenhofer 1875)

= Epiphryne verriculata =

Species of moth

Epiphryne verriculata, the cabbage tree moth, is a species of geometer moth (Geometridae). These moths only occur in New Zealand, where they are widespread. As larvae they exclusively feed on several species of cabbage trees (Cordyline). Their wings have an unusual pattern that allows them to camouflage it against dead leaves of cabbage trees. The species was first described in 1875 by Baron Cajetan von Felder and Alois Friedrich Rogenhofer. The larvae are bright green, but become brownish as they get older. The female lays eggs on the leaves, on which it also hides during day time. After hatching, the larvae feed on live leaves, creating distinctive notches and channels in the leaves. They take several months to mature into adults. The larvae are known be parasitised by insects such as braconid wasps and bristle flies.

== Taxonomy ==
Epiphryne verriculata was first described by Baron Cajetan von Felder & Alois Friedrich Rogenhofer in 1875 under the name Cidaria verriculata. The species was later moved to the genus Panopaea in 1884, then to Pancyma in 1886 and then to Venusia in 1917, with these changes all being made by British entomologist Edward Meyrick. In 1964, the species was finally moved from Venusia to the genus Epiphryne, in which it currently remains. The type specimen is stored in the Natural History Museum of London. They are commonly referred to as "cabbage tree moths".

== Description ==
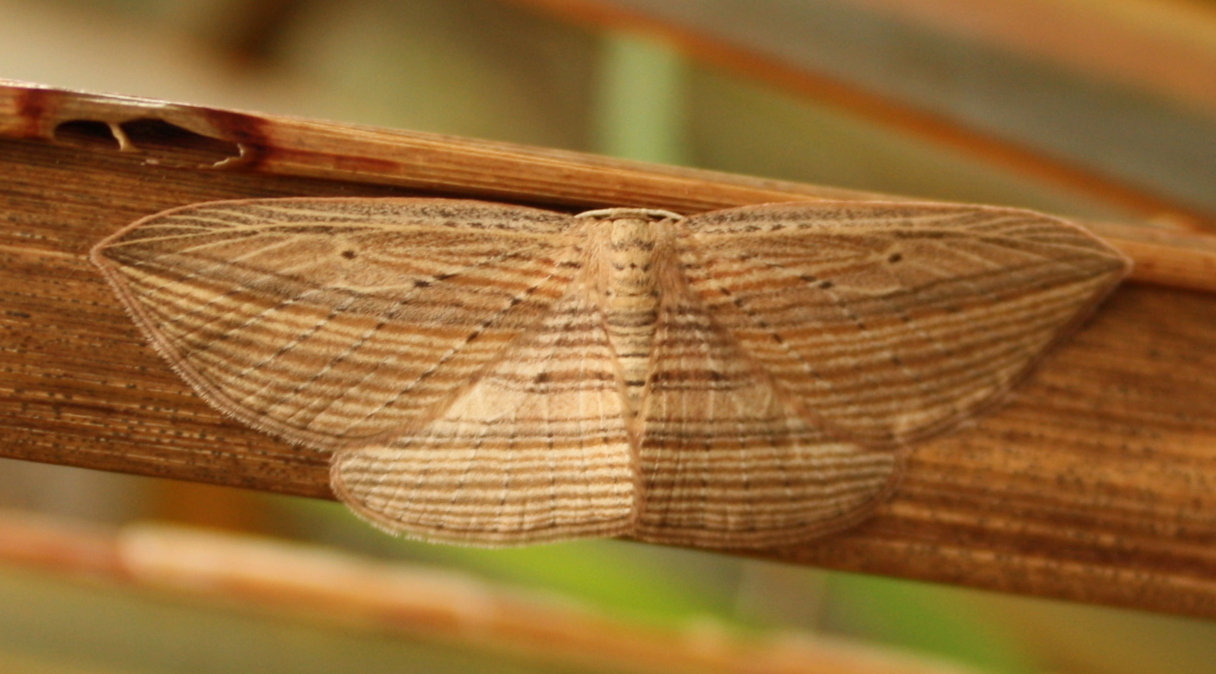
A cabbage tree moth on a leaf of New Zealand flax (Phormium sp.)

The wingspan of the adults is about 3.8 cm. The wings are typically a light brownish colour, although there is some variation. Running along the wings are brownish parallel lines. On the second pair of wings, the lines are somewhat thicker in the middle, with more space on either side of them. The abdomen also has a brown line pattern, which smoothly aligns with the pattern on the wings. With this line pattern, the moths are able to camouflage themselves on the dead leaves of Cordyline trees.

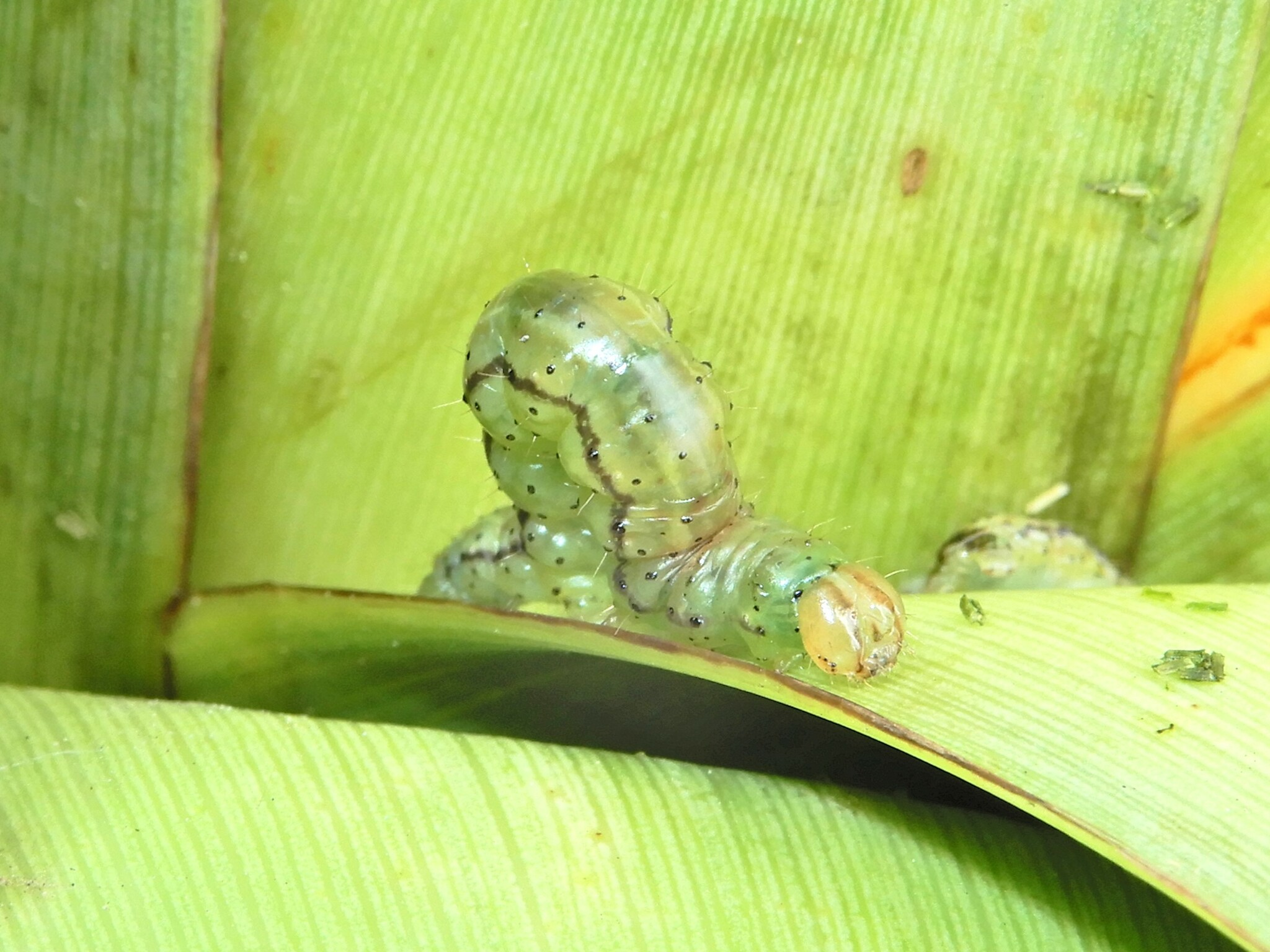
Larva

=== Larvae ===
The larvae are overall coloured green, but darken to brown as they mature. The head is yellowish-brown with pairs of dark stripes at the sides and near the top. The segments of the body each have four black spots on the upper surface and three on the side, except for the third and fourth segments which just have a single row of spots. Their bodies also have dark lines running down their sides. When fully grown they are roughly 2.5 cm in length.

=== Eggs ===
The eggs are 0.75–0.79 mm in length and 0.58 mm wide. They have an oval, almost cylindrical shape and are somewhat transparent. The surface of the eggs has a series of hexagonal and pentagonal reticulations which are around 0.04 mm in diameter. Although they are bright green when laid, the eggs become a mix of red-brown and bright green a few days later. As the eggs continue to mature, the red-brown areas become bigger until the eggs are red.

== Distribution and habitat ==
E. verriculata are endemic to New Zealand and are widespread throughout the North Island and South Island. They also occur on Stewart Island. Its favoured habitats are wetland and native forest, but it can be found in urban parks and gardens, as cabbage trees are commonly grown in cultivation.

== Life history ==
Length of phases to reach adulthood
Phase	Duration in days
Egg	15–22
Larva 1st instar	15
Larva 2nd instar	13
Larva 3rd instar	13
Larva 4th instar	12
Larva 5th instar	21
Pupal cocoon building	2
Larva living in pupal cocoon	4–5
Pupation	50 (in winter)

Roughly 12 eggs are laid at a time, being laid on both live and dead leaves at night. The eggs are usually laid in tidy rows and take 15–22 days to hatch. The larvae have five instars which are phases between moults that allow them to grow. One study has reported that the 1st, 2nd, 3rd, 4th and 5th instars take 15, 13, 13, 12 and 21 days respectively. The larvae feed on leaves to grow. During the 1st to 4th instars, the larvae carve channels in the leaves, but during the 5th instar they gnaw notches out of the sides of the leaves. The larvae can be found hiding in the base of the leaves where the leaves fold together, creating crevices for them to hide in. The larvae pupate either on the cabbage tree in crevices or in dead leaf bases or on the ground underneath. Adults can be seen from spring to late summer (October to May).

=== Host plants ===
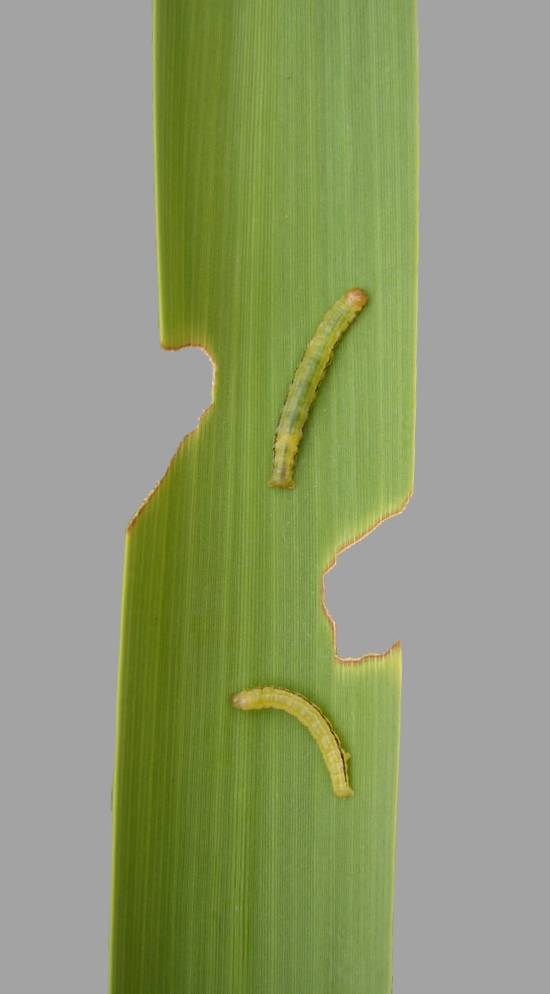
Cabbage tree moth caterpillars feeding on a cabbage tree leaf

As larvae, E. verriculata feed on new and unopened leaves of Cordyline, also known as cabbage trees. They have been recorded feeding on Cordyline australis, Cordyline banksii and Cordyline indivisa, all of which are only found in New Zealand. The larvae feeding on the live leaves create distinctive channels, holes and notches in the Cordyline leaves which can be used to infer their presence. As the leaf opens and grows the notches likewise grow and become more noticeable.

Populations of Cordyline australis from more southern regions tend to grow "skirts" from their dead leaves around their trunks, which is thought to help prevent frost damage. It has been speculated that this growth pattern does not occur in other populations because losing the skirts reduces the amount of suitable habitat for E. verriculata and other animals to hide in, preventing them from becoming established and feeding on the tree.

== Behaviour ==
The moth sits with its body perpendicular to the leaf's long axis and wings pressed up against the leaf, its markings lining up with the veins. If disturbed, the will only fly a short distance before finding another dead brown leaf to settle on, avoiding the green fresh leaves. The markings of the adults wings allow it to blend in with dead Cordyline leaves. They will rest on the leaves during day time, before continuing with their activities during the night. Adults are attracted to light and have been collected via a mercury vapour light trap.

== Predators and parasites ==
They are preyed upon by numerous other insects. The larvae of the hoverflies Melangyna novaezelandiae and Allograpta ropala are known to prey upon Epiphryne verriculata larvae. Cermatulus nasalis, a species of shield bug, has also been recorded preying upon the larvae. The tachinid Pales feredayi are parasitoids of the moth larvae. In their larvae stage, they live and develop in the moth larvae before emerging as an adult when the moth larvae undergoes pupation. The braconid wasps Aleiodes declanae and Meteorus pulchricornis are also endoparasitoids of the moth larvae, with the latter species being introduced to New Zealand.
