= Screw Up =

Studio album by Super Junky Monkey
- Released: 1994
- Label: Sony Music

Super Junky Monkey chronology
Cabbage (1994)	Screw Up (1994)	Parasitic People (1996)

Professional ratings
Review scores
Source	Rating
AllMusic	4/5 stars
The Encyclopedia of Popular Music	3/5 stars

Screw Up is the 1994 debut studio album by Japanese group Super Junky Monkey. It showcased their fusion of rap, hardcore, punk, and funk music. It was released in Japan and, in 1995, the United States.

== Critical reception ==
AllMusic called the album "a surprising success," writing that "listeners may not be sure what to make of Super Junky Monkey, but anyone looking for a unique take on rock and metal would surely find themselves greatly amused and delighted." Trouser Press wrote that "Super Junky Monkey bring the chops and enormous flexibility to their funhouse vision of modern music, but sometimes crazy shit is just crazy shit." The Baltimore Sun called the band "eclectic" and "daring," writing that "'Kioku no netsuzou' alternates between crunchy Metallica-style power riffs and angular, King Crimson dissonance before dropping a few rap-style rhymes."

== Track listing ==
1. Shukuchoku No Choro Wa Chirou De Sourou (Old Man On The Nightshift With Prostatitis)
2. Zakuro No Hone (Bone Of Pomegranate)
3. Kioku No Netsuzou (Fabrication Of Memory)
4. Buckin’ The Bolts
5. Bakabatka (All Stupid)
6. Tamage—Shiyoumae (Tamage Before)
7. Ukatousen
8. Popobar
9. Where’re The Good Times
10. Revenge
11. Decide
12. Get Out
13. Tamage—Shiyougo (Tamage After)
14. We’re The Mother
15. Shower
16. Fuji Funka Sunzen (Mt. Fuji About To Erupt)
17. untitled bonus track
