= Super Junky Alien =

EP by Super Junky Monkey
- Released: December 1, 1996
- Genre: Avant-garde metal, funk metal
- Label: Sony

Super Junky Monkey chronology
Parasitic People (1996)	Super Junky Alien (1996)	E Kiss O (1998)

Super Junky Alien is a 1996 EP by Japanese group Super Junky Monkey. It is a concept album which revolves around the concept of an RPG video game. Each track is thought of as a 'stage' in the video game, and there are video game type sound effects throughout the album. It was released only in Japan and was the group's final release before the death of singer Mutsumi. It features a bonus track cover from 1995 of MTV's Top of the Hour theme.

== Track listing ==
1. S.J.A.
2. R.P.G
3. I Got The Third
4. Sky Surfer Go Go Go
5. Love & Peace Hard Core
6. Stage 666
7. Seven
8. MTV Top Of The Hour
