= Songs Are Our Universe =

Compilation album by Super Junky Monkey
- Released: 20 July 2001
- Label: Condor

Super Junky Monkey chronology
Parasitic People (1996)	Songs Are Our Universe (2001)

Songs Are Our Universe is a posthumous retrospective/rare tracks collection for the Japanese band Super Junky Monkey. It is a double-CD set, and was released in 2001. It also features some bonus videos.

The CD is currently out of print.

== Track listing ==
=== Disc 1 ===
1. Super Junky Monkey Theme
2. R.P.G
3. Blah, Blah, Blah
4. Nani (What)
5. Gokai (Misunderstanding)
6. Bakabatka (All Stupid)
7. A¥I¥E¥T¥O¥H
8. Skysurfer Strike Force
9. Tell Me Your All
10. Start With Makin’ A Fire
11. Tamage
12. I Call Myself “Sliced Ice”
13. Kioku No Netsuzou (Spit Bug) (Fabrication Of Memory)
14. Where’re The Good Times
15. Decide
16. Popobar
  - QuickTime Movies:
    - Buckin’ The Bolts (live)
    - RPG
    - We’re The Mother
    - Decide (live)

=== Disc 2 ===
1. Parasitic People
2. The Words
3. Zakuro No Hone (Bone Of Pomegranate)
4. I Got The Third
5. Seven
6. Genshi No Sairai (New Song)
7. Shower
8. If
9. We’re The Mother
10. Love & Peace Hard Core
  - QuickTime Movies:
    - Towering Man (live)

=== Info ===
- Tracks off of Cabbage: Disc 1: 1
- Tracks off of Screw Up: Disc 1:6,11,13,14,15,16 Disc 2:3,7,9
- Tracks off of Parasitic People: Disc 1: 4,5,10 Disc 2:1,2,6,8
- Tracks off of AIETOH: Disc 1: 3,7
- Tracks off of Super Junky Alien: Disc 1: 2 Disc 2: 4,5,10
- Previously unreleased tracks: Disc 1: 8,9
