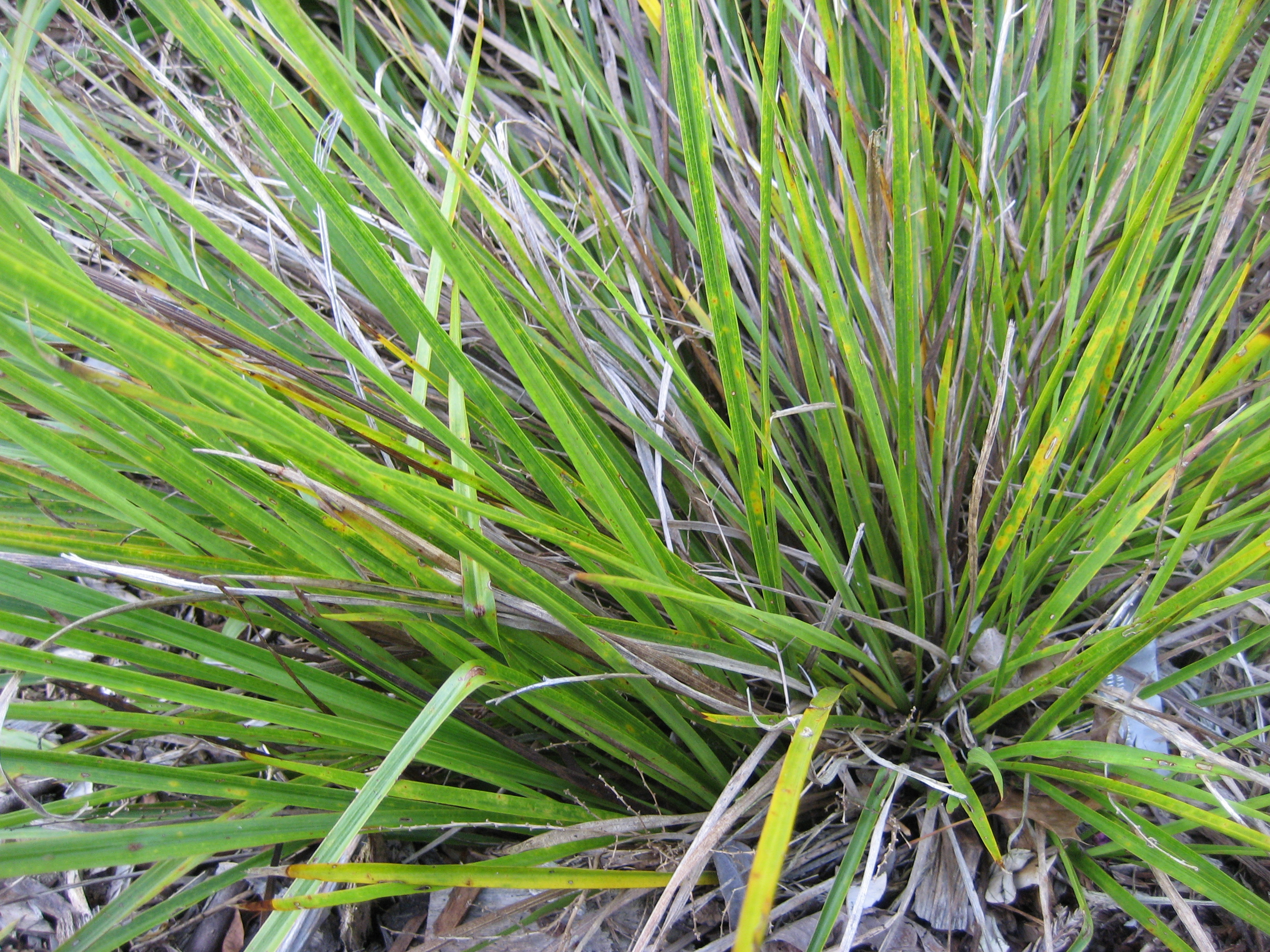
- Cordyline pumilio, Auckland Botanic Gardens

Scientific classification
- Kingdom: Plantae
- Clade: Tracheophytes
- Clade: Angiosperms
- Clade: Monocots
- Order: Asparagales
- Family: Asparagaceae
- Subfamily: Lomandroideae
- Genus: Cordyline
- Species: C. pumilio

Binomial name
- Cordyline pumilio Hook. f.
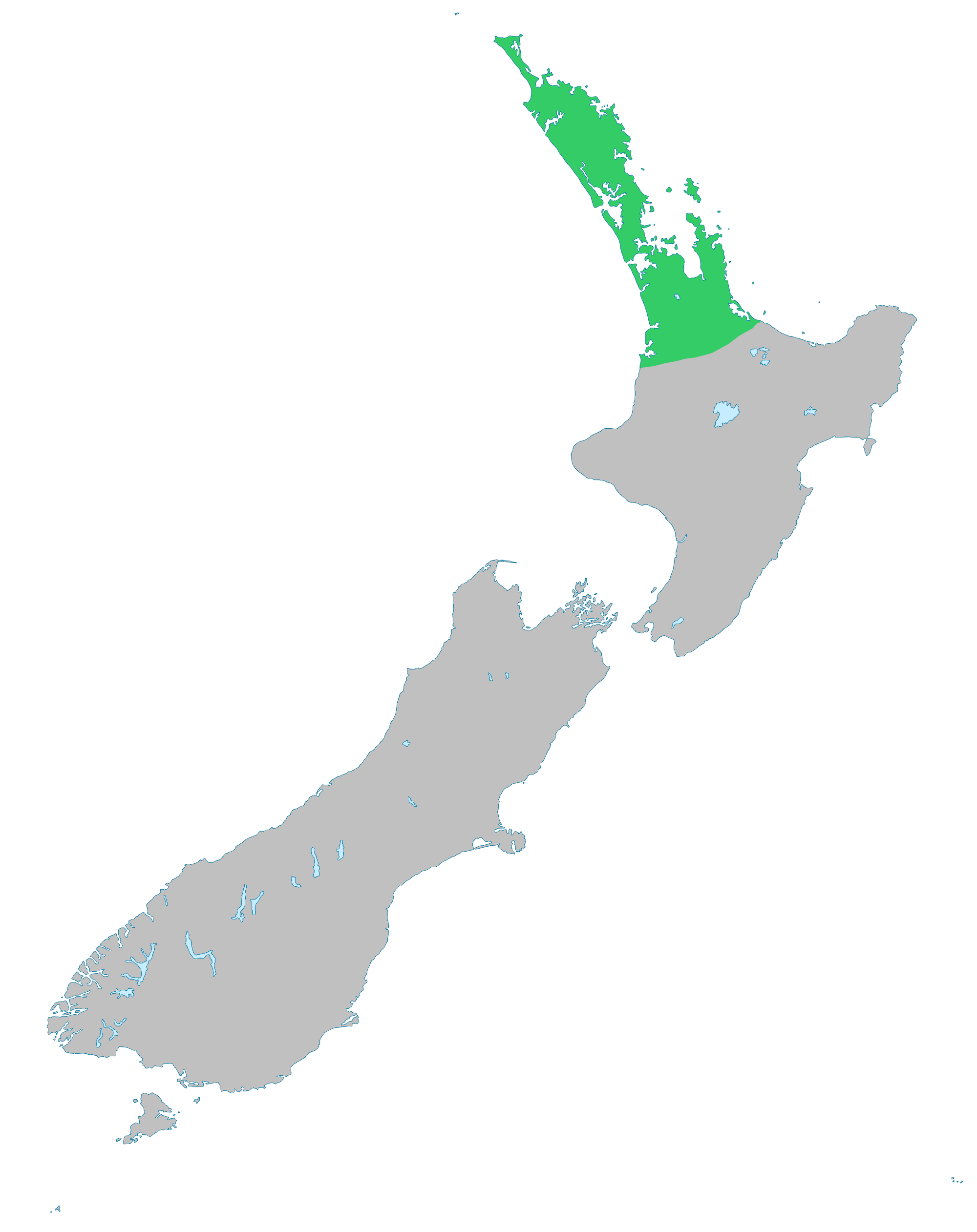
- Natural range of C. pumilio (green)

= Cordyline pumilio =

Species of flowering plant

Cordyline pumilio, commonly known as the dwarf cabbage tree, pygmy cabbage tree or by its Māori names tī koraha or tī rauriki, is a narrow-leaved monocot shrub endemic to the North Island of New Zealand. It usually grows up to 1 metre (3.3 feet) tall, although rare examples of 2 metres tall have been reported. It has long leaves and can easily be mistaken for a grass or a sedge. C. pumilio grows in the north of the North Island from North Cape at 34°S to Kawhia and Ōpōtiki at about 38°S, generally under light forest and scrub. It was cultivated by Māori as a source of carbohydrate and used as a relish to sweeten less palatable foods.

== Taxonomy ==
Cordyline pumilio is the smallest of New Zealand's five native species of Cordyline. Of the other species, the commonest are the common cabbage tree (C. australis), a tree up to 20 metres (66 feet) tall with a stout trunk and sword-like leaves, the forest cabbage tree (C. banksii) which has a slender, sweeping trunk, and the mountain cabbage tree (C. indivisa), a handsome plant with a trunk up to 8 metres high bearing a dense, rounded head of broad leaves 1 to 2 metres long. In the far north of New Zealand, C. pumilio is thought to have hybridised with C. australis.

The genus name Cordyline derives from an Ancient Greek word for a club (kordyle), a reference to the enlarged underground stems or rhizomes, and the species name pumilio is Latin for "dwarf". The common name Cabbage tree is attributed by some sources to early settlers having used the young leaves of related species as a substitute for cabbage.

The plant was well known to Māori, who cultivated it for its sugar-laden roots and stems before its discovery and naming by Europeans. The generic Māori language term for plants in the genus Cordyline is tī, and names recorded as specific to C. pumilio include tī koraha and tī rauriki.

== Description ==
Cordyline pumilio is a plant rarely exceeding 2 metres (6.6 feet) tall. It is a very narrow-leaved species, and does not develop into the large tree-like form of C. australis. It often flowers while its short stem is leafy to the ground. In older plants the bare part of stem is up to 1 metre (3.3 feet) long and 1.5 cm (less than an inch) wide, and not usually very erect. The leaves are 30 cm to 1 metre (1–3 ft) long and 1 to 2 cm (up to an inch) wide, and may narrow above the base into a channelled petiole. The midrib is prominent abaxially, or at least proximally and the leaf margins are slightly recurved. The flower spike or panicle appears in November or December and is up to 60 by 30 cm (1.97 by 0.98 ft), very open with slender axes, branched to the second order, with small white or bluish-white flowers irregularly scattered along the branches. The bracts are often small and inconspicuous. The tepals are narrow, recurved and have three nerves. The stigma is short and trifid.

== Cultural use ==
Cordyline pumilio was cultivated by Māori in the Waikato district and elsewhere all over New Zealand. Young seedlings were carefully selected and planted out, and after perhaps three years the roots were dug up, stacked in small piles, and dried in the sun. As they dried, the fibrous roots were burned off, and then the roots were scraped and baked slowly in an umu or hāngī, requiring twelve to eighteen hours to cook. The cooked roots were chewed, or pounded and washed and squeezed to extract the sugar, which was eaten with fern root as a relish. Māori ranked the taste of the plant above tī kōuka (C. australis) and the other native species, but below tī pore (Cordyline fruticosa) which they brought with them from tropical Polynesia.

== Bibliography ==
- "Cordyline pumilio". New Zealand Plant Conservation Network.
- "Cordyline pumilio". Flora of New Zealand.
- Salmon J. T. (1973). The Native Trees of New Zealand. Wellington. AH & AW Reed. ISBN 0-589-01340-8
- Simpson, P. (2000). Dancing Leaves: The story of the New Zealand cabbage tree: Ti Kouka. Christchurch. Canterbury University Press.
