= Cabbage patch =

Cabbage patch may refer to:

- Cabbage Patch, California, an unincorporated community in Yuba County, California, US
- Cabbage Patch, Dublin, also known as the Cabbage Garden, a park and former burial ground in Dublin, Ireland
- Cabbage Patch Kids, a line of dolls
- Cabbage Patch, a dance involving putting the hands together in the form of fists and moving them in a horizontal, circular motion
- A plot of land on which cabbage is grown
- Twickenham Stadium, a stadium in Twickenham, London, UK

== See also ==
- Cabbage
- Cabbage (disambiguation)
