= Super Junky Monkey =

Japanese funk metal group

- Origin: Japan
- Genres: Funk metal, alternative metal, avant-garde metal
- Years active: 1991–1999, 2009–2010, 2015–2016, 2019

Super Junky Monkey was an all female Japanese funk metal group.

== History ==
=== Beginning ===
Their first release was in 1994: a live recording called Cabbage, originally released as an audio recording, but also released as a video recording later that year. This was quickly followed in 1995 by the studio album Screw Up, which features some of the songs from Cabbage as well as some new tracks.

The band released two full-length albums, both of which were released internationally. Additionally, in Japan, they released several EPs and three concert videos.

The band's performances of "Skysurfers!!" and "I Call Myself Sliced Ice" were used as the opening and end credits music, respectively, for the second season of the American animated series, Skysurfer Strike Force.

The album Super Junky Alien features a bonus 1996 cover of the MTV Top of the Hour tune.

=== Death of Mutsumi ===
On February 5, 1999, Mutsumi Fukuhara committed suicide by leaping from the balcony of her apartment in Osaka, leaving behind her husband and one-year-old son. The other band members decided not to continue without her and instead moved on to other projects.

Several years after Mutsumi's death, the band released the material they were working on at the time as the E-KISS-O EP and the greatest hits Songs Are Our Universe. E-KISS-O includes three songs with Mutsumi's vocals and two instrumentals. Songs of Our Universe features two unreleased tracks and several videos. On June 20, 2009, the remaining three members of Super Junky Monkey reunited to commemorate the tenth anniversary of Mutsumi's death with a performance at the Liquid Room in Tokyo, Japan.

== Musical style ==
They performed and merged various styles and genres of music, including hardcore, heavy metal, hip hop, jazz, avant-garde, noise rock and funk. Influences on the band members include Steve Vai, Jaco Pastorius, Madball, Pink Floyd and Mr. Bungle. AllMusic states "A quick description of the band would be 'Japanese all-girl Faith No More or Primus'".

== Members ==
- Mutsumi "623" Fukuhara, née Takahashi — vocals
- Keiko — guitar
- Shinobu Kawai — bass
- Matsudaaahh!! — drums

== Discography ==
=== LPs ===
- Cabbage (1994)
- Screw Up (1994)
- Parasitic People (1996)
- Super Junky Alien (1996)

=== EPs ===
- A.I.E.T.O.H. (1995)
- E Kiss O (2001)

=== Collections ===
- Songs Are Our Universe (2001)
- Is the Best (2015)

=== Compilation appearances ===
- Benten Bentoh - "Po Po Bar"
- Japanese Homegrown Vol. 1 - "Another Mother"
- Japanese Homegrown Vol. 2 - "If (Take 2)"
- Soy Milk Vol. 1 - "Towering Man"

=== Videos ===
- キャベツ ビデオ (1994)
- Deathi (1995)
- Holy Mother Of Meatloaf (1996)
- Live - We're The Mother Of Meatloaf! Hyper Collection (2010)
