= Barry L. Frankhauser =

Australian archaeologist

Barry L. Frankhauser is an archaeologist who has worked in Australia and New Zealand.

== Works ==
Frankhauser's Ph.D. thesis (published 1986) was a study of historical uses of the cabbage tree (Cordyline australis), an important food and fibre source in the Māori culture for at least 800 years. The Māori Television network produced a TV documentary on the subject, using his thesis as a starting point, which aired in 2004. The documentary includes an interview with Frankhauser.

In 1990 Frankhauser participated in a two-day seminar (Geochemical Methods for Dating of Rock Art) held in Canberra, which drew archeologists from three continents to evaluate the scientific soundness of the cation-ratio method of dating ancient rock art specimens. That seminar concluded that the method had significant drawbacks and should be re-evaluated as a definitive test.
