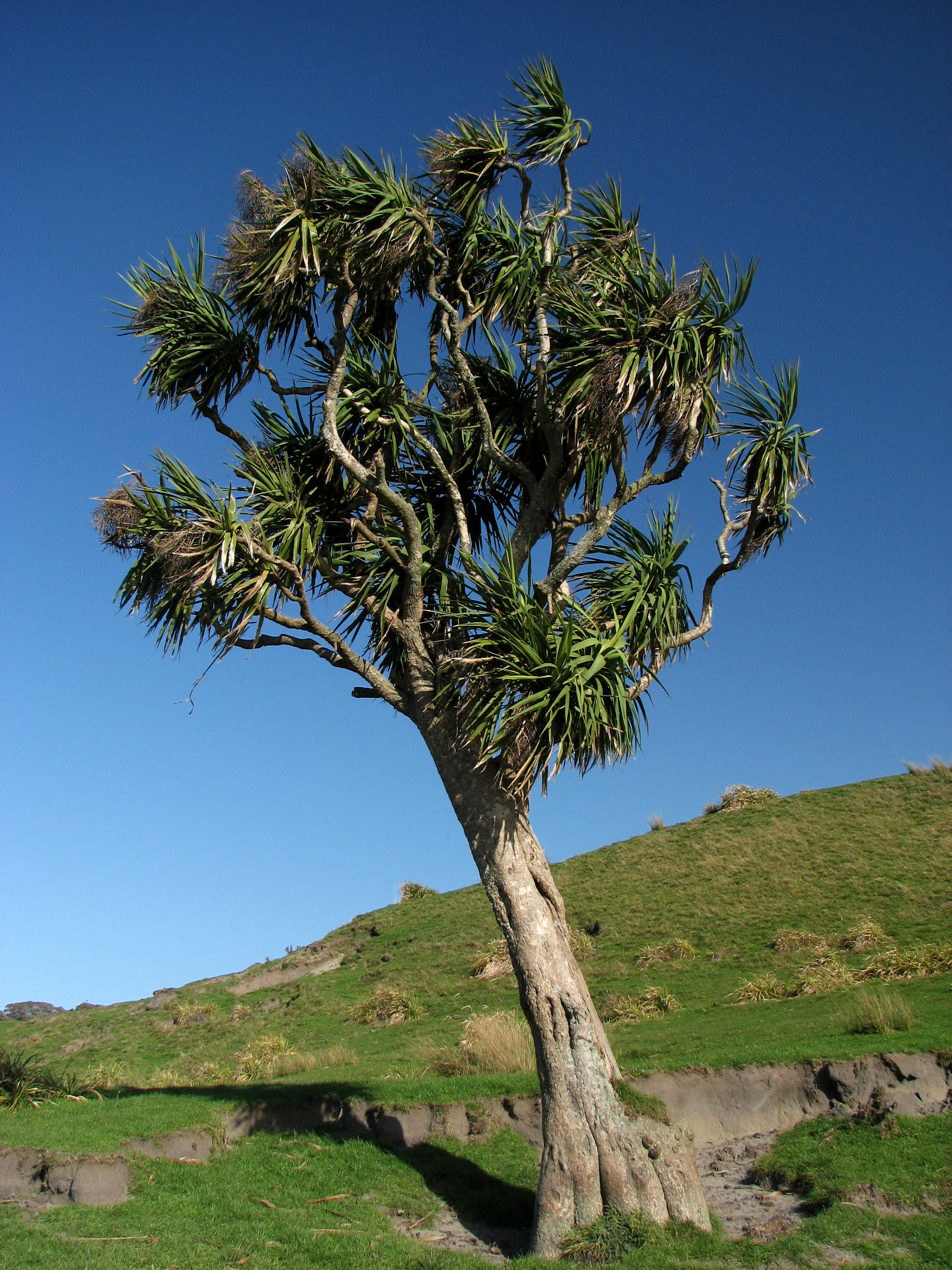
- Cabbage tree on farmland, Tasman District, New Zealand

Scientific classification
- Kingdom: Plantae
- Clade: Tracheophytes
- Clade: Angiosperms
- Clade: Monocots
- Order: Asparagales
- Family: Asparagaceae
- Subfamily: Lomandroideae
- Genus: Cordyline
- Species: C. australis

Binomial name
- Cordyline australis (G.Forst.) Endl.
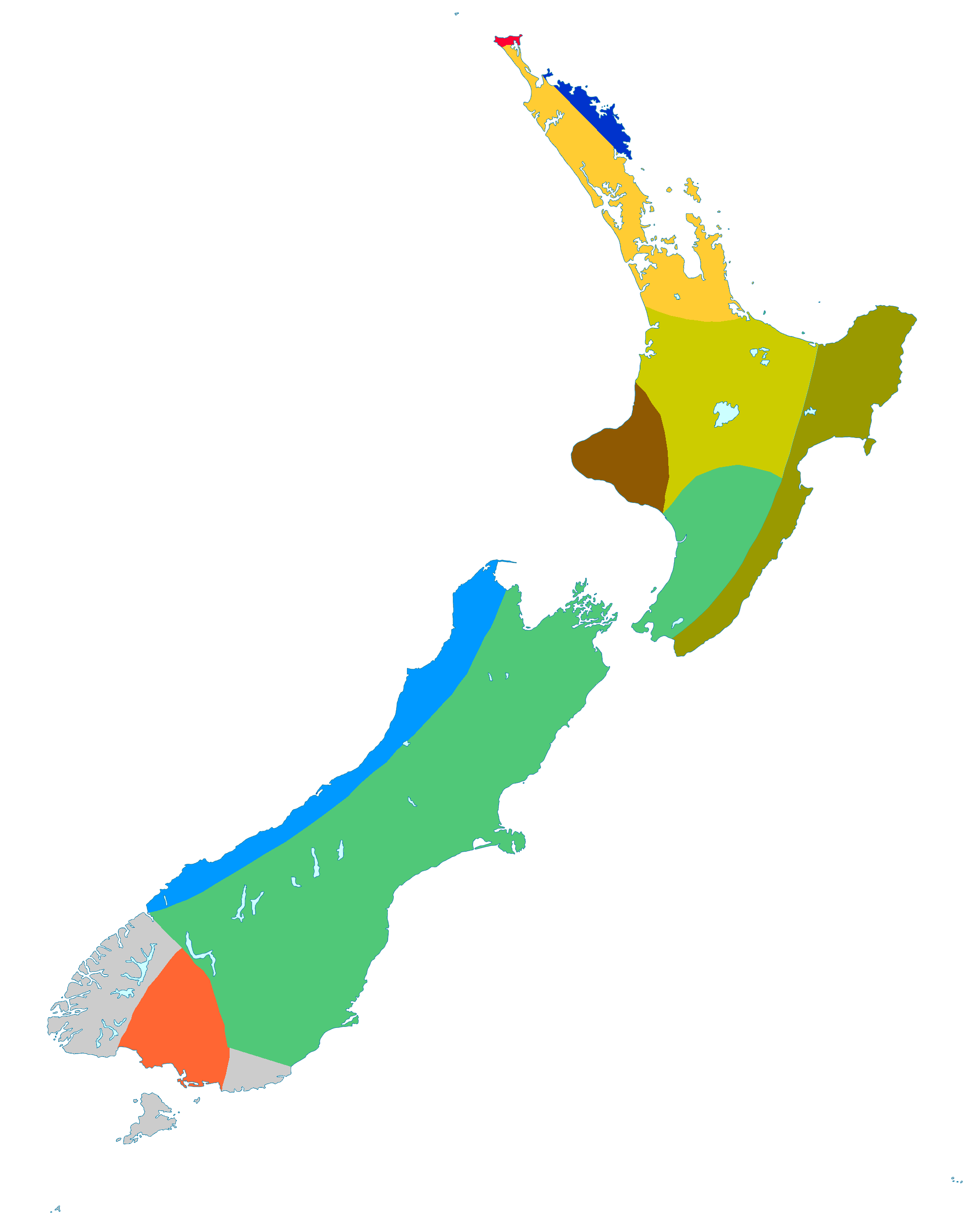
C. australis varies within its natural range. Some variants have Māori names.
C. pumilio hybrids	C. obtecta hybrids
tītī	tī manu
tarariki	densely branched
wharanui	robust
lax leaves	naturally absent

= Cordyline australis =

Species of tree

Cordyline australis, commonly known as the cabbage tree, or by its Māori name of tī or tī kōuka, is a widely branched monocot tree endemic to New Zealand.

It grows up to 20 metres (66 feet) tall with a stout trunk and sword-like leaves, which are clustered at the tips of the branches and can be up to 1 metre (3 feet 3 inches) long. With its tall, straight trunk and dense, rounded heads, the tree is a characteristic feature of the New Zealand landscape. It is common over a wide latitudinal range from the far north of the North Island to the south of the South Island. It grows in a broad range of habitats.

Māori used it as a source of food, particularly in the South Island, where it was cultivated in areas where other crops would not grow. It provided durable fibre for textiles. Hardy and fast growing, it is widely planted in New Zealand gardens, parks and streets, and numerous cultivars are available. It can also be found in large numbers in island restoration projects, such as Tiritiri Matangi Island, where it was among the first seedling trees to be planted.

It is also grown as an ornamental tree in higher latitude Northern Hemisphere countries with maritime climates, including parts of the upper West Coast of the United States, Canada and the British Isles, where its common names include Cornish palm, cabbage palm, Torbay palm and Torquay palm.

== Description ==
Cordyline australis grows up to 20 metres (66 feet) tall with a stout trunk 1.5 to 2 m (4 ft 11 in to 6 ft 7 in) in diameter. The largest known tree, at Pākawau, Golden Bay / Mohua, was estimated to be 400 or 500 years old, and stood 17 metres (56 feet) tall with a circumference of 9 metres (30 feet) at the base. Before it flowers, it has a slender unbranched stem. The first flowers typically appear at 6 to 10 years old, in spring. The right conditions can reduce the first flowering age to 3 years (Havelock North, 2015 mast year). After the first flowering, it divides to form a much-branched crown with tufts of leaves at the tips of the branches. Each branch may fork after producing a flowering stem. The pale to dark grey bark is corky, persistent and fissured, and feels spongy to the touch.

The long narrow leaves are sword-shaped, erect, dark to light green, 40 to 100 cm (16 to 39 in) long and 3 to 7 cm (1 to 3 in) wide at the base, with numerous parallel veins. The leaves grow in crowded clusters at the ends of the branches, and may droop slightly at the tips and bend down from the bases when old. They are thick and have an indistinct midrib. The fine nerves are more or less equal and parallel. The upper and lower leaf surfaces are similar.

In spring and early summer, sweetly perfumed flowers are produced in large, dense panicles (flower spikes) 60 to 100 cm (24 to 39 in) long, bearing well-spaced to somewhat crowded, almost sessile to sessile flowers and axes. The flowers are crowded along the ultimate branches of the panicles. The bracts which protect the developing flowers often have a distinct pink tinge before the flowers open. In south Canterbury and North Otago the bracts are green.

The individual flowers are 5 to 6 mm (3/16 to 1/4 in) in diameter, the tepals are free almost to the base, and reflexed. The stamens are about the same length as the tepals. The stigmas are short and trifid. The fruit is a white berry 5 to 7 mm (3/16 to 9/32 in) in diameter which is greedily eaten by birds. The flowers have a "strong and sweet scent", and the nectar attracts great numbers of insects to the flowers.

Large, peg-like rhizomes, covered with soft, purplish bark, up to 3 metres (10 feet) long in old plants, grow vertically down beneath the ground. They serve to anchor the plant and to store fructose in the form of fructan. When young, the rhizomes are mostly fleshy and are made up of thin-walled storage cells. They grow from a layer called the secondary thickening meristem.

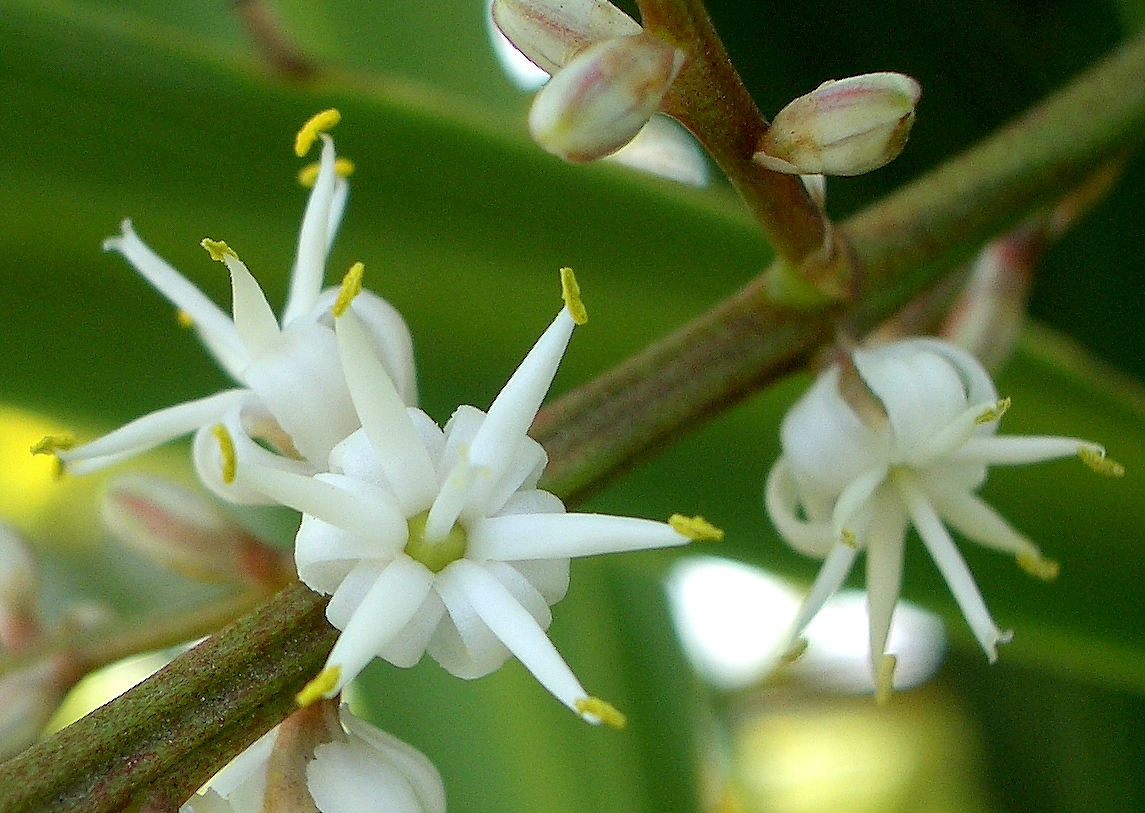
Magnified view of flowers of C. australis.

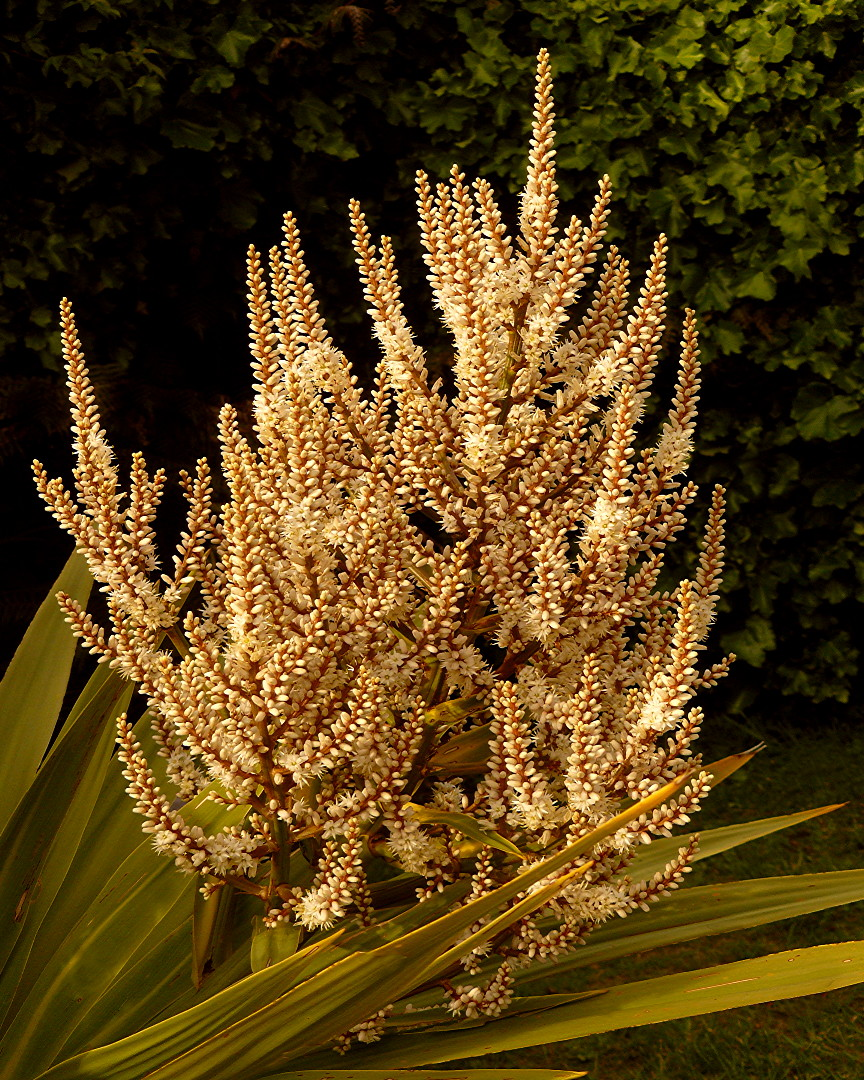
The inflorescence, or flower spike, produced in spring and early summer

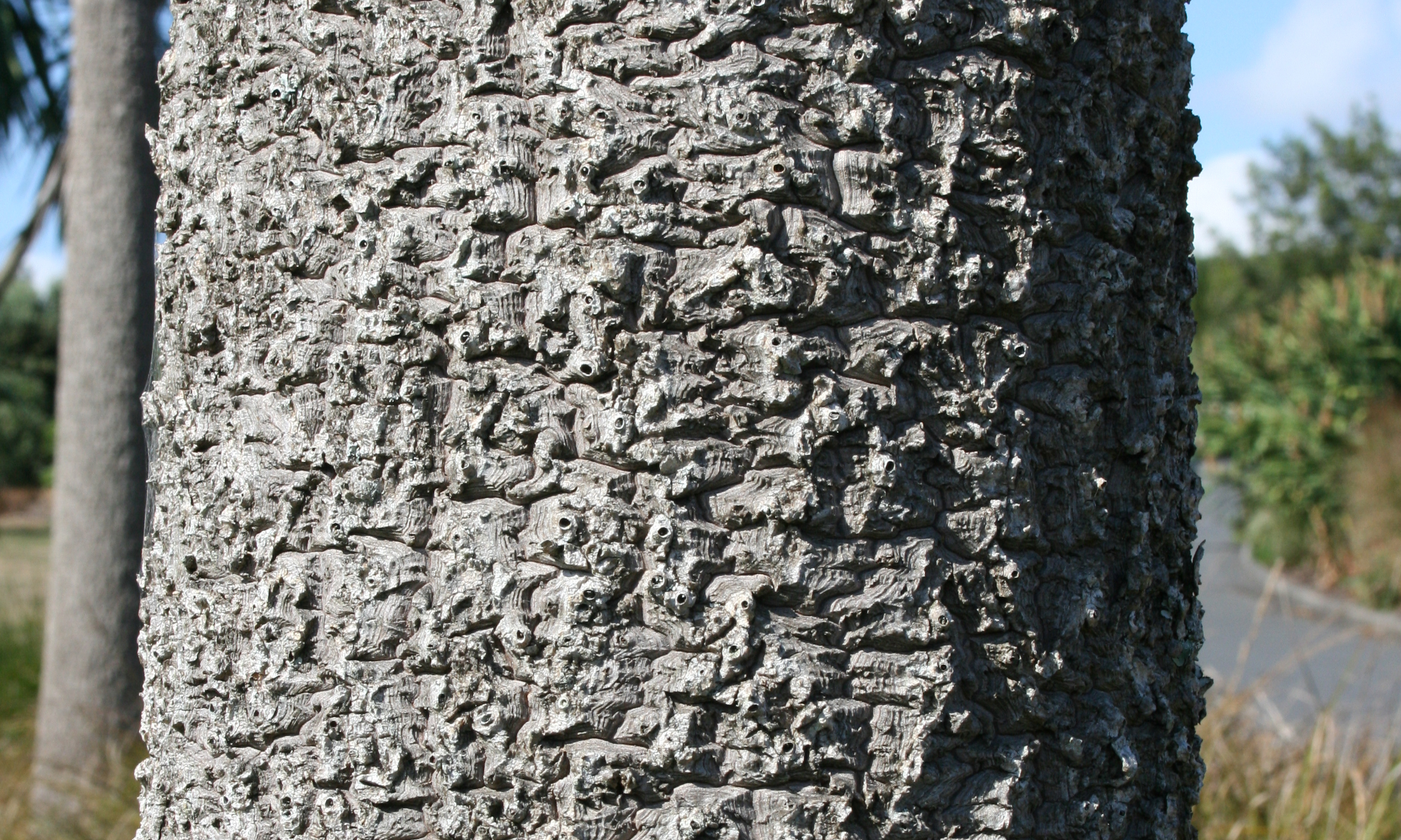
The corky, fissured bark of C. australis feels spongy to the touch.

=== Regional diversity ===
New Zealand's native Cordyline species are relics of an influx of tropical plants that arrived from the north 15 million years ago in the warm Miocene era. Because it has evolved in response to the local climate, geology and other factors, C. australis varies in appearance from place to place. This variation can alter the overall appearance of the tree, canopy shape and branch size, the relative shape and size of the leaves, and their colour and stiffness. There may also be invisible adaptations for resistance to disease or insect attack. Some of these regional provenances are different enough to have been named by North Island Māori: tītī in the north, tī manu in the central uplands, tarariki in the east and wharanui in the west. In Northland, C. australis shows a great deal of genetic diversity—suggesting it is where old genetic lines have endured. Some trees in the far north have floppy, narrow leaves, which botanist Philip Simpson attributes to hybridisation with C. pumilio, the dwarf cabbage tree.

In eastern Northland, C. australis generally has narrow, straight dark green leaves, but some trees have much broader leaves than normal and may have hybridised with the Three Kings cabbage tree, C. obtecta, which grows at North Cape and on nearby islands. These obtecta-like characteristics appear in populations of C. australis along parts of the eastern coastline from the Karikari Peninsula to the Coromandel Peninsula. In western Northland and Auckland, a form often called tītī grows. When young, tītī are generally very spindly, and are common in young kauri forests. When growing in the open, tītī can become massive trees with numerous, long thin branches and relatively short, broad leaves.

In the central Volcanic Plateau, cabbage trees are tall, with stout, relatively unbranched stems and large stiff straight leaves. Fine specimens are found along the upper Whanganui River. On old trees, the leaves tend to be relatively broad. The leaves radiate strongly, suggesting that tī manu is adapted to the cold winters of the upland central plateau. It may have originated in the open country created by lava, volcanic ash, and pumice. Trees of the tī manu type are also found in northern Taranaki, the King Country and the Bay of Plenty lowlands.

Tarariki are found in the east of the North Island from East Cape to the Wairarapa. Māori valued the narrow spiky leaves as a source of particularly tough, durable fibre. Tarariki's strong leaf fibres may be an adaptation to the region's hot, dry summers. In parts of the Wairarapa, the trees are particularly spiky, with stiff leaves and partially rolled leaf-blades. The trees near East Cape, by contrast, have leaves that hang laxly on the tree. In Hawke's Bay, some trees have greener, broader leaves, and this may be because of wharanui characteristics brought in across the main divide through the Manawatū Gorge.

Wharanui grow to the west of the North Island's main divide. They have long, broad flaccid leaves, which may be an adaptation to persistent westerly winds. The wharanui type occurs in Wellington, Horowhenua and Whanganui, and extends with some modifications to the southern Taranaki coast. In Taranaki, cabbage trees generally have a compact canopy with broad straight leaves. In the South Island, wharanui is the most common form, but it is variable. The typical form grows, with little variation, from Cape Campbell to the northern Catlins, and from the eastern coast to the foothills of the Southern Alps / Kā Tiritiri o te Moana. In Marlborough's Wairau Valley, cabbage trees tend to retain their old, dead leaves, lending them an untidy appearance. The climate there is an extreme one, with hot, dry summers and cold winters.

In north-west Nelson, there are three ecotypes defined by soil and exposure. Trees growing on limestone bluffs have stiff, blue-green leaves. On the river flats, the trees are tall with narrow, lax, dark green leaves, and an uneven canopy. They resemble the cabbage trees of the North Island's East Cape. Along the coast to the far west, the trees are robust with broad, bluish leaves. The latter two forms extend down the West Coast, with the lax-leaved forms growing in moist, fertile, sheltered river valleys while the bluish-leaved forms prefer rocky slopes exposed to the full force of the salt-laden coastal winds.

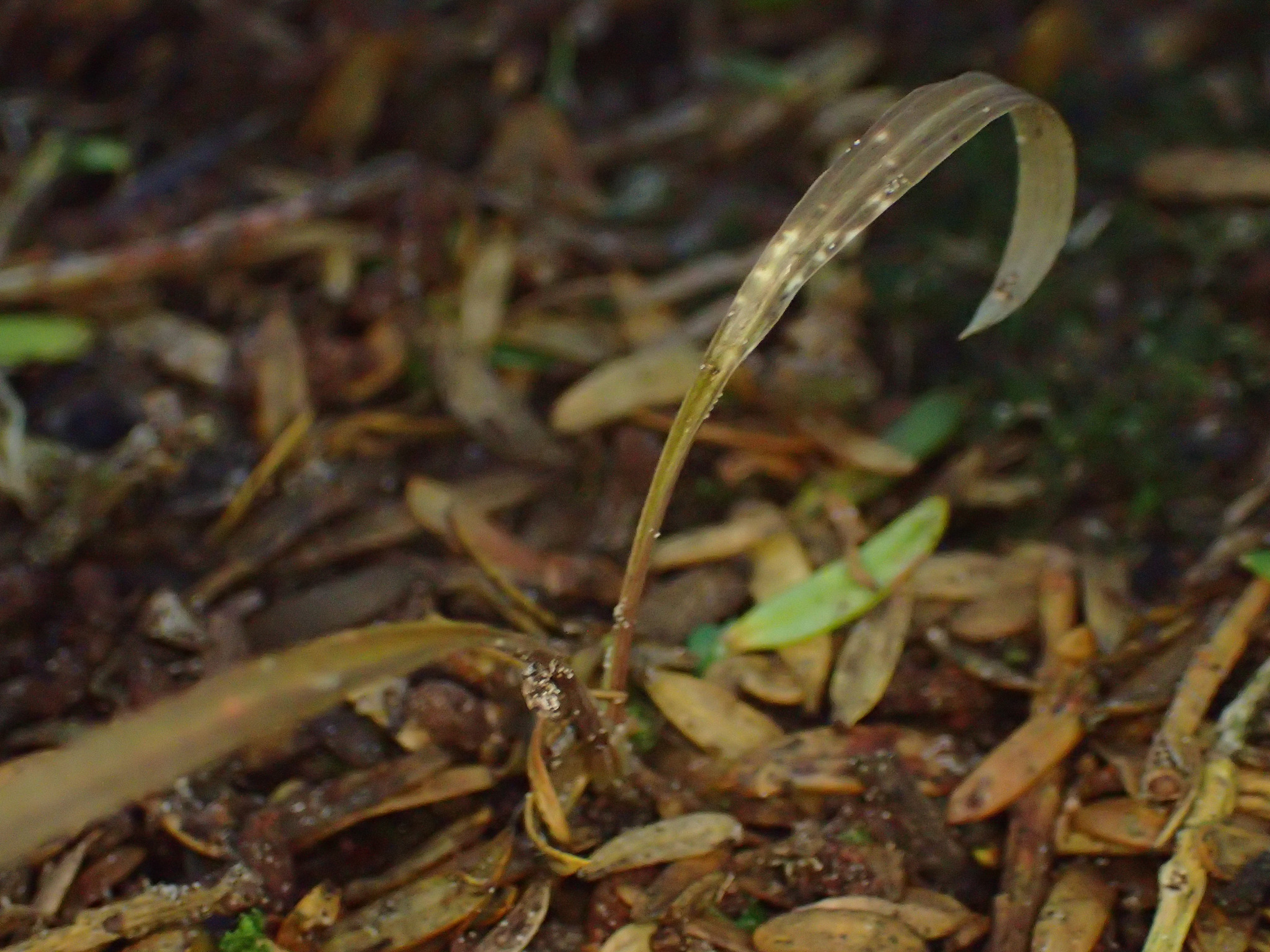
Cabbage trees seedlings that grow in southern areas of New Zealand tend to grow longer, narrower leaves.

In Otago, cabbage trees gradually become less common towards the south until they come to an end in the northern Catlins. They reappear on the south coast at Waikawa, Southland, but they are not the wharanui type. Rather they are vigorous trees with broad, green leaves and broad canopies. Absent from much of Fiordland, it was probably introduced by Māori to the Chatham Islands at 44° 00′S and to Stewart Island / Rakiura at 46° 50′S. They extend along the coast towards Fiordland, and inland to the margins of some of the glacier-fed lakes. Very vigorous when they are young, these trees seem well adapted to the very cold winters of the south.

A study of seedlings grown from seed collected in 28 areas showed a north-south change in leaf shape and dimensions. Seedling leaves get longer and narrower southwards. Seedlings often have leaves with red-brown pigmentation which disappears in older plants, and this colouration becomes increasingly common towards the south. The changes in shape—leaves getting narrower and more robust from north to south and from lowland to montane—suggest adaptations to colder weather.

== Taxonomy and names ==
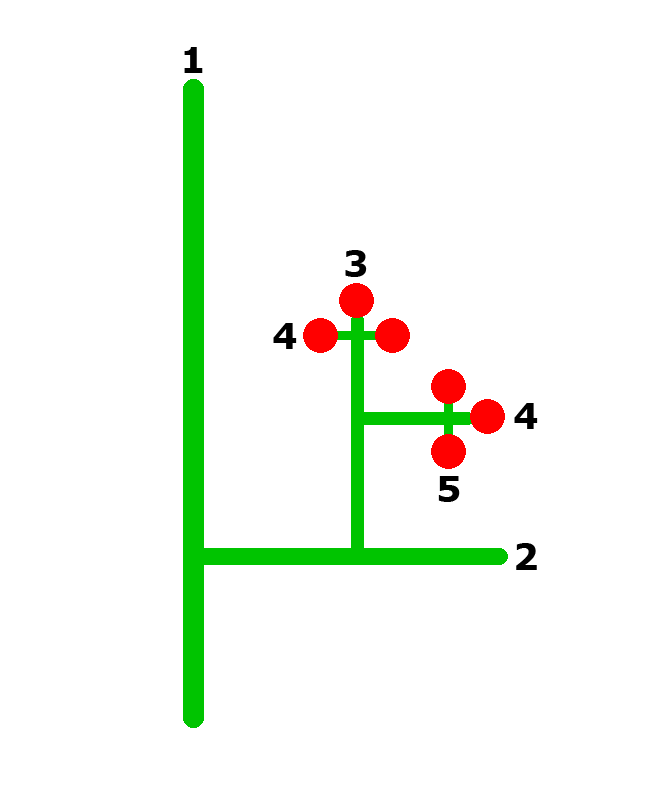
The inflorescence of C. australis usually has four levels of branching: 1: the main stem; 2: the side branches (10 to 50); 3: flower-bearing branches (100 to 500); 4: the single flowers themselves (thousands); 5: sometimes the largest side branches have a fifth level of branching

Cordyline australis was collected in 1769 by Sir Joseph Banks and Dr Daniel Solander, naturalists on the Endeavour during Lieutenant James Cook's first voyage to the Pacific. The type locality is Queen Charlotte Sound / Tōtaranui. It was named Dracaena australis by Georg Forster who published it as entry 151 in his Florulae Insularum Australium Prodromus of 1786. It is sometimes still sold as a Dracaena, particularly for the house plant market in Northern Hemisphere countries. In 1833, Stephan Endlicher reassigned the species to the genus Cordyline.

The genus name Cordyline derives from an Ancient Greek word for a club (kordyle), a reference to the enlarged underground stems or rhizomes, while the species name australis is Latin for "southern". The common name cabbage tree is attributed by some sources to early settlers having used the young leaves as a substitute for cabbage. However, the name probably predates the settlement of New Zealand — Georg Forster, writing in his Voyage round the World of 1777 about the events of Friday, 23 April 1773, refers on page 114 to the discovery of a related species in Fiordland as "not the true cabbage palm" and says "the central shoot, when quite tender, tastes something like an almond's kernel, with a little of the flavour of cabbage." Forster may have been referring to the cabbage palmetto (Sabal palmetto) of Florida, which resembles the Cordyline somewhat, and was named for the cabbage-like appearance of its terminal bud.

Cordyline australis is the tallest of New Zealand's five native Cordyline species. Of these, the commonest are C. banksii, which has a slender, sweeping trunk, and C. indivisa, a handsome plant with a trunk up to 8 metres (26 feet) tall bearing a massive head of broad leaves up to 2 m (6 ft 7 in) long. In the far north of New Zealand, C. australis can be distinguished by its larger heavily branched tree form, narrower leaves and smaller seeds from C. obtecta, the Three Kings cabbage tree, its closest relative. C. australis is rather variable, and forms from the northern offshore islands may be hybrids with C. obtecta. Hybrids with C. pumilio and C. banksii also occur often where the plants are in close vicinity, because they flower at about the same time and share the chromosome number 2n=38, with C. australis.

The tree was well known to Māori before its scientific discovery. The generic Māori language term for plants in the genus Cordyline is tī, cognate with Tongan sī and Hawaiian kī (from Proto-Austronesian *siRi, C. fruticosa or C. terminalis). Names recorded as specific to C. australis include tī kōuka, tī kāuka, tī rākau, tī awe, tī pua, and tī whanake. Each tribe had names for the tree depending on its local uses and characteristics. Simpson reports that the names highlight the characteristics of the tree that were important to Māori. These include what the plant looked like—whether it was a large tree (tī rākau, tī pua), the whiteness of its flowers (tī puatea), whether its leaves were broad (tī wharanui), twisted along the edges (tī tahanui), or spiky (tī tarariki). Other names refer to its uses—whether its fruit attracted birds (tī manu), or the leaves were particularly suitable for making ropes (tī whanake) and nets (tī kupenga). The most widely used name, tī kōuka, refers to the use of the leaf hearts as food.

== Ecology ==
=== Habitat ===
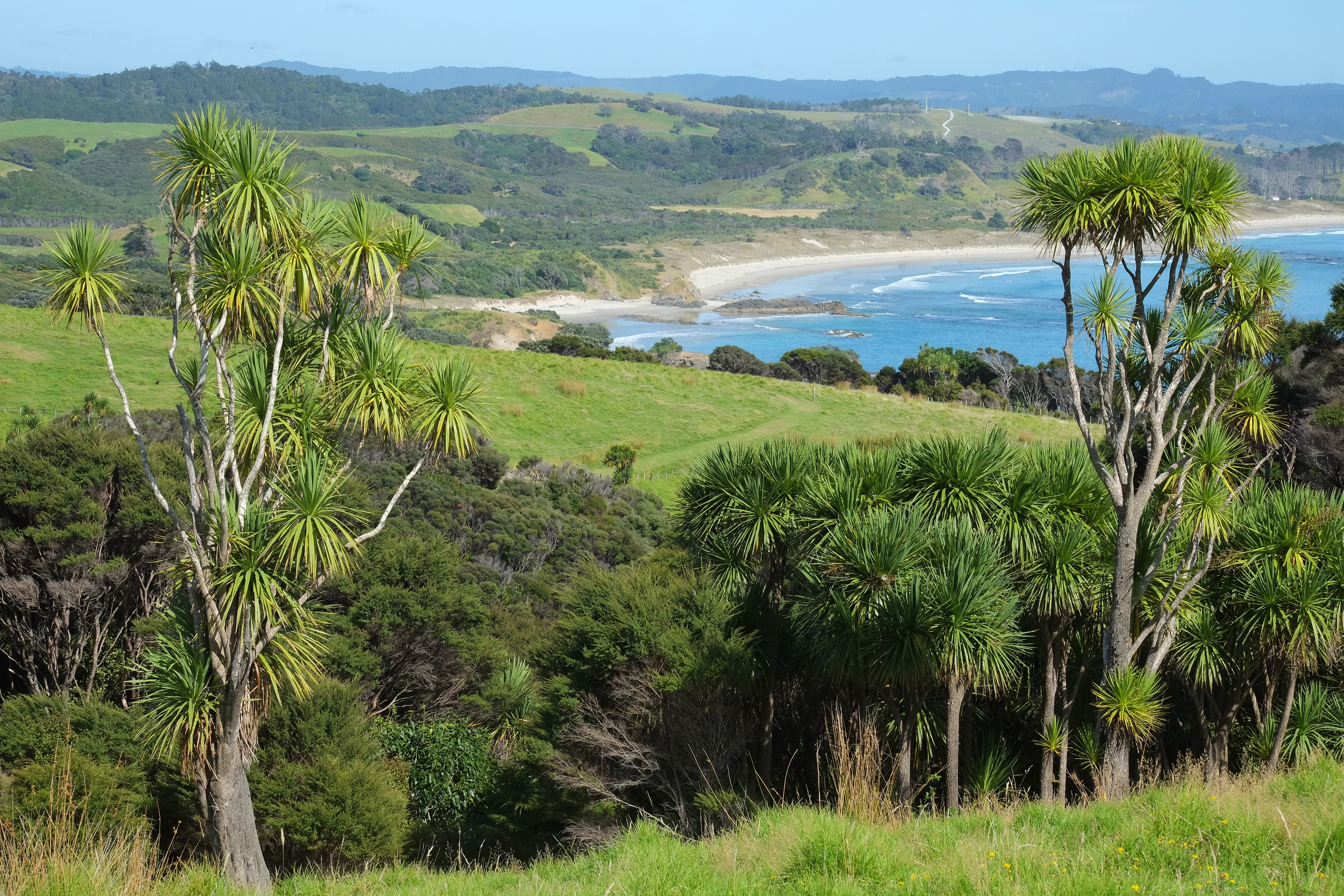
Cabbage trees growing on the Tāwharanui Peninsula, Auckland.

A quote from Philip Simpson sums up the wide range of habitats the cabbage tree occupied in early New Zealand, and how much its abundance and distinctive form shaped the impression travellers received of the country:

"In primeval New Zealand cabbage trees occupied a range of habitats, anywhere open, moist, fertile and warm enough for them to establish and mature: with forest; around the rocky coast; in lowland swamps, around the lakes and along the lower rivers; and perched on isolated rocks. Approaching the land from the sea would have reminded a Polynesian traveller of home, and for a European traveller, conjured up images of the tropical Pacific".

Cordyline australis occurs from North Cape to the very south of the South Island, where it becomes less and less common, until it reaches its southernmost natural limits at Sandy Point (46° 30' S), west of Invercargill near Oreti Beach. It is absent from much of Fiordland, probably because there is no suitable habitat, and is unknown on the subantarctic islands to the south of New Zealand, probably because it is too cold. It occurs on some offshore islands—Poor Knights, Stewart and the Chathams—but was probably introduced by Māori. In the Stewart Island region, it is rare, growing only on certain islands, headlands and former settlement sites where it may have been introduced by muttonbird collectors, while on the Chatham Islands it is also largely "a notable absentee".

Generally a lowland species, it grows from sea level to about 1,000 metres (3,300 feet), reaching its upper limits on the volcanoes of the central North Island, where eruptions have created open spaces for it to exploit, and in the foothills of the Southern Alps in the South Island, where deforestation may have played a part in giving it room to grow. In the central North Island, it has evolved a much sturdier form (with the Māori name tī manu, meaning "with branches bearing broad, straight upright leaves"). This form resembles that found in the far south of the South Island, suggesting that they are both adapted to cold conditions.

Cordyline australis is a light-demanding pioneer species, and seedlings die when overtopped by other trees. To grow well, young plants require open space so they are not shaded out by other vegetation. Another requirement is water during the seedling stage. Although adult trees can store water and are drought resistant, seedlings need a good supply of water to survive. This stops the species from growing in sand dunes unless there are wet depressions present, and from hillsides unless there is a seepage area. The fertility of the soil is another factor—settlers in Canterbury used the presence of the species to situate their homesteads and gardens. The fallen leaves of the tree also help to raise the fertility of the soil when they break down. Another factor is temperature, especially the degree of frost. Young trees are killed by frost, and even old trees can be cut back. This is why C. australis is absent from upland areas and from very frosty inland areas.

Early European explorers of New Zealand described "jungles of cabbage trees" along the banks of streams and rivers, in huge swamps and lowland valleys. Few examples of this former abundance survive today—such areas were the first to be cleared by farmers looking for flat land and fertile soil. In modern New Zealand, cabbage trees usually grow as isolated individuals rather than as parts of a healthy ecosystem.

=== Reproduction ===
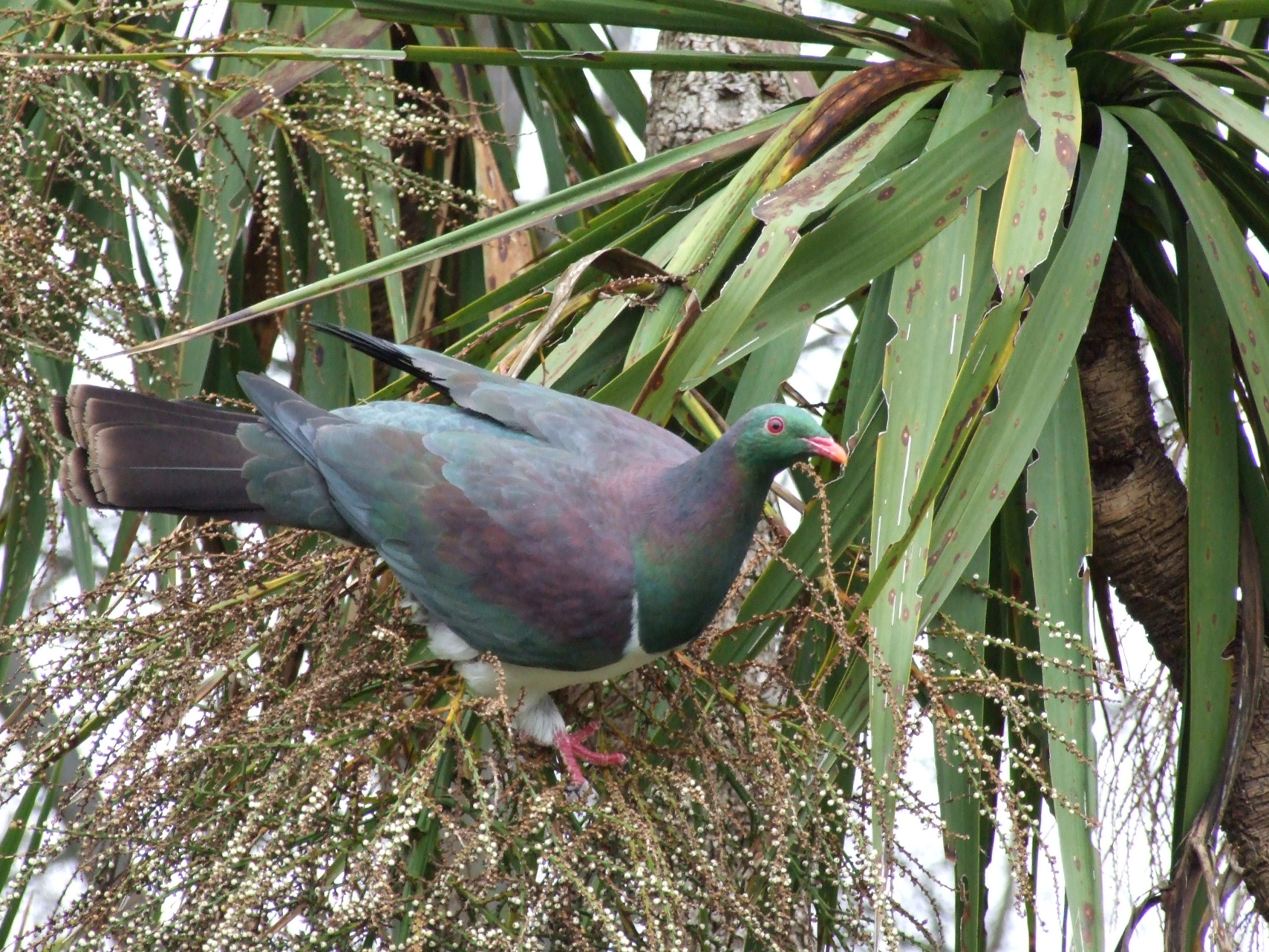
A kererū feeds on the small white fruit of a cabbage tree, Dunedin, August 2009. Native pigeons were once the major dispersers of the tree's seeds, which they eat in autumn and winter. Note also the notches cut out of the leaves by larvae of Epiphryne verriculata, the cabbage tree moth.

The cabbage tree's year begins in autumn among the tight spike of unopened leaves projecting from the centre of each tuft of leaves. Some of the growing tips have changed from making leaves to producing inflorescences for the coming spring, and around these, two or three buds begin to produce leaves. The inflorescence and the leaf buds pass the winter protected by the enveloping spike of unopened leaves. Months later in spring or early summer, it bears its flowers on the outside of the tree, exposed to insects and birds.

Flowering takes place over a period of four to six weeks, giving maximum exposure to pollinating insects. The flowers produce a sweet perfume which attracts large numbers of insects. The nectar produced by the flowers contains aromatic compounds, mainly esters and terpenes, which are particularly attractive to moths. Bees use the nectar to produce a light honey to feed their young and increase the size of the hive in the early summer. It takes about two months for the fruit to ripen, and by the end of summer a cabbage tree can have thousands of small fruits available for birds to eat and disperse. The strong framework of the inflorescence can easily bear the weight of heavy birds like the New Zealand pigeon, which was formerly the major disperser of the seeds.

Each fruit contains three to six shiny, black seeds which are coated in a charcoal-like substance called phytomelan. The latter may serve to protect the seeds from the digestive process in the gut of a bird. The seeds are also rich in linoleic acid as a food source for the developing embryo plant, a compound which is also important in the egg-laying cycle of birds. Because it takes about two years for a particular stem to produce an inflorescence, cabbage trees tend to flower heavily in alternative years, with a bumper flowering every three to five years. Each inflorescence bears 5,000 to 10,000 flowers, so a large inflorescence may carry about 40,000 seeds, or one million seeds for the whole tree in a good flowering year—hundreds of millions for a healthy grove of trees.

=== Response to fire ===
Cordyline australis is one of the few New Zealand forest trees that can recover from fire. It can renew its trunk from buds on the protected rhizomes under the ground. This gives the tree an advantage because it can regenerate itself quickly and the fire has eliminated competing plants. Cabbage tree leaves contain oils which make them burn readily. The same oils may also slow down the decay of fallen leaves, so that they build up a dense mat that prevents the seeds of other plants from germinating. When the leaves do break down, they form a fertile soil around the tree. Cabbage tree seed also has a store of oil, which means it remains viable for several years. When a bushfire has cleared the land of vegetation, cabbage tree seeds germinate in great numbers to make the most of the light and space opened up by the flames.

Older trees sometimes grow epicormic shoots directly from their trunks after storm or fire damage. Aerial rhizomes can also be produced from the trunk if it sustains damage or has become hollow and grow down into the soil to regenerate the plant. Such regeneration can lead to trees of great age with multiple trunks.

=== Biodiversity ===
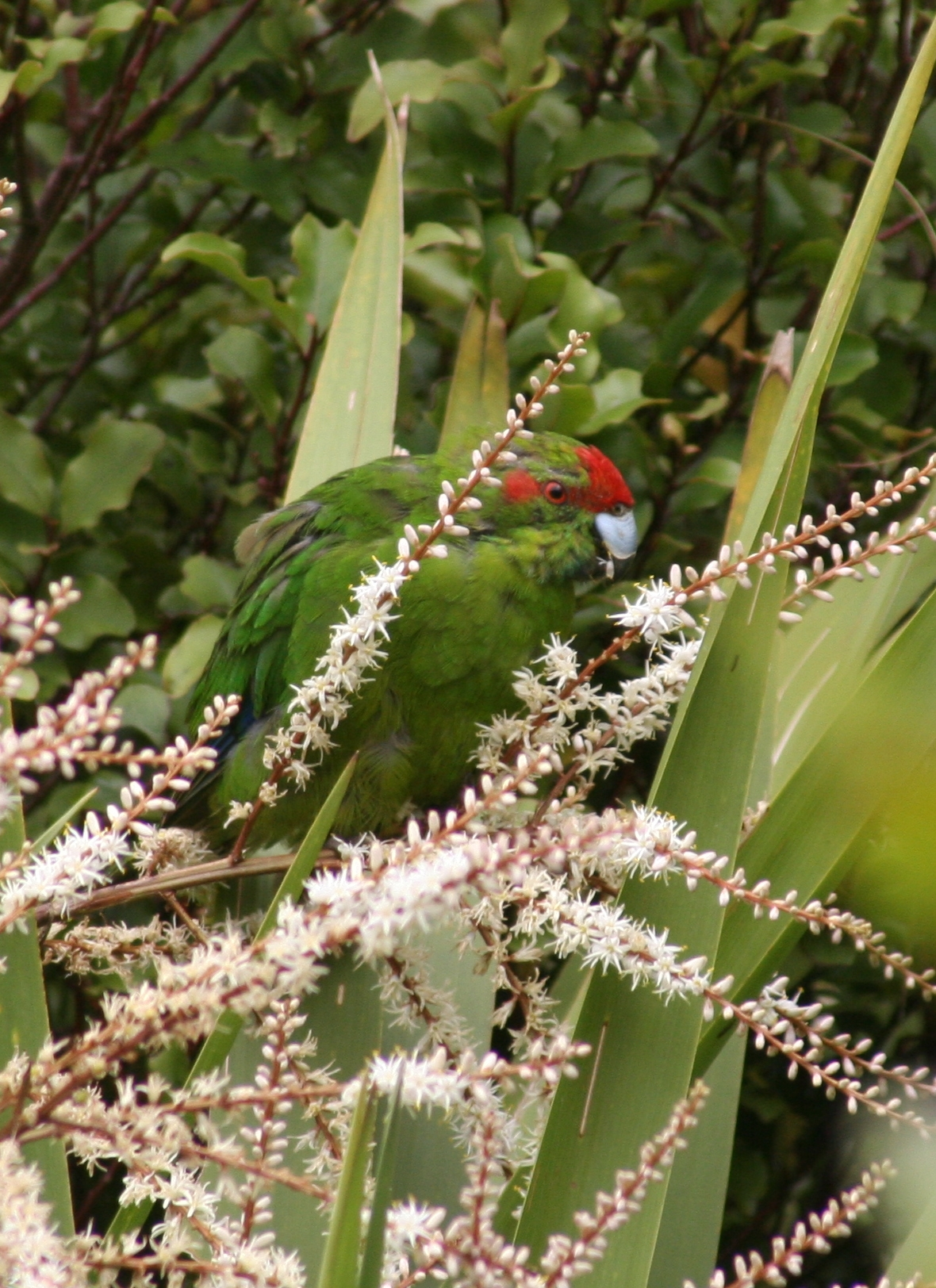
A kākāriki feeding on flowers of Cordyline australis on Tiritiri Matangi Island. The parakeets are often seen foraging in cabbage trees on the island.

Many plants and animals are associated with C. australis in healthy ecosystems. The most common epiphytes are ferns, astelias and orchids. Old trees often carry large clumps of the climbing fern Asplenium, and in moist places, filmy ferns and kidney ferns cling to the branches. Astelia species and Collospermum often establish in the main fork of the tree, and one tree can host several species of native orchid. Other common epiphytes include Griselinia lucida, as well as a range of mosses, liverworts, lichens and fungi. Two fungus species which infect living tissue—Phanaerochaeta cordylines and Sphaeropsis cordylines—occur almost exclusively on C. australis. The lichen Lithothelium kiritea, primarily found on the west coast of New Zealand, grows exclusively on the bark of C. australis.

Animals and birds associated with C. australis include lizards which forage among the flowers, including the gold-striped gecko which is well camouflaged for life among the leaves of the tree. New Zealand bellbirds like to nest under the dead leaves or among the flower stalks, and paradise shelducks commonly build their nests in the base of an old cabbage tree standing in the middle of a field. Red-crowned parakeets are often seen foraging in cabbage trees. In South Canterbury, long-tailed bats shelter during the day in the hollow branches, which would once have provided nesting holes for many birds.

The berries of C. australis are enjoyed by bellbirds, tūī, and kererū. Māori sometimes planted groves of cabbage trees (pā tī) to attract kererū which could be snared when they came to eat the berries. Reminiscing in 1903 about life in New Zealand sixty or more years earlier, George Clarke describes how such a tapu grove of cabbage trees would attract huge numbers of pigeons: "About four miles from our house, there was a great preserve of wood pigeons, that was made as tapu as the native chiefs could devise. At a certain season, the pigeons came in vast flocks to feed on the white berries of the Ti tree (bracœna) [sic] and got so heavy with fat that they could hardly fly from one tree to another. No gun was allowed in the place. The Māoris, with a long slender rod and a slip noose at the end, squatted under the leaves and noiselessly slipped the noose over the necks of the stupid pigeons as they were feeding." As the native birds have vanished from much of New Zealand with the clearing of forests, it is now flocks of starlings which descend upon the fruit.

The nectar of the flowers is sought after by insects, bellbirds, tūī, and stitchbirds. The leaves and the rough bark provide excellent homes for insects such as caterpillars and moths, small beetles, fly larvae, wētā, snails and slugs. Many of these are then eaten by birds such as saddlebacks and robins. The rough bark also provides opportunities for epiphytes to cling and grow, and lizards hide amongst the dead leaves, coming out to drink the nectar and to eat the insects. Good flowering seasons occur every few years only. While it is said that they foretell dry summers, it has been observed that they tend to follow dry seasons.

Insects, including beetles, moths, wasps and flies, use the bark, leaves and flowers of the tree in various ways. Some feed or hide camouflaged in the skirt of dead leaves, a favourite dry place for wētā to hide in winter. Many of the insect companions of the tree have followed it into the domesticated surroundings of parks and home gardens. If the leaves are left to decay, the soil underneath cabbage trees becomes a black humus that supports a rich array of amphipods, earthworms and millipedes.

There are nine species of insect only found on C. australis, of which the best known is Epiphryne verriculata, the cabbage tree moth, which is perfectly adapted to hide on a dead leaf. Its caterpillars eat large holes and wedges in the leaves. The moth lays its eggs at the base of the central spike of unopened leaves. The caterpillars eat holes in the surface of the leaves and leave characteristic notches in the leaf margins. They can infest young trees but seldom damage older trees, which lack the skirt of dead leaves where the parent moths like to hide.

== Threats, pests and diseases ==
=== Sudden decline ===
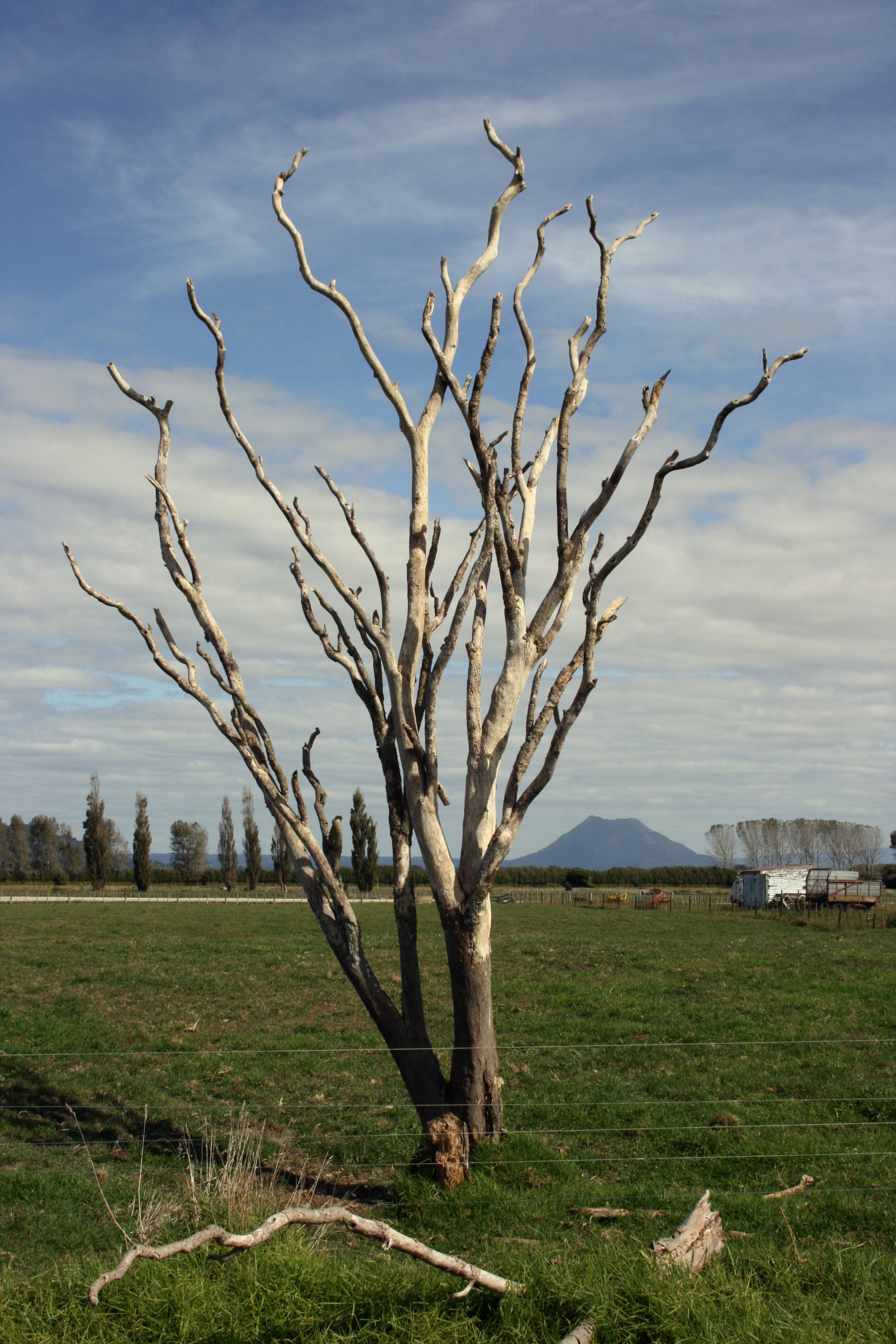
Sudden decline has decimated populations of C. australis in some parts of New Zealand.

Cases of sick and dying trees of C. australis were first reported in the northern part of the North Island in 1987. The syndrome, eventually called sudden decline, soon reached epidemic proportions in Northland and Auckland. Affected trees usually suffer total defoliation within 2 to 12 months. The foliage turns yellow, and the oldest leaves wither and fall off. Growth of leaves ceases, and eventually all the leaves fall, leaving dead branches, often with the dried-out flowering panicles still attached. At the same time, the bark on the trunk becomes loose and detaches easily. The greatest number of dead trees (18 to 26 percent) was recorded around Auckland.

For some years, the cause of the disease was unknown, and hypotheses included tree ageing, fungi, viruses, and environmental factors such as an increase in ultra-violet light. Another hypothesis was that a genetic problem may have been induced in Northland and Auckland by the thousands of cabbage trees brought into the area from elsewhere and planted in gardens and parks. The Lands and Survey Department had a native plant nursery at Taupō in the central North Island, which was used to grow plants for use in parks, reserves and carparks. In many Northland parks, cabbage trees from the central North Island were growing and flowering within metres of natural forms. Any offspring produced might have been poorly adapted to local conditions. After nearly five years of work, scientists found the cause was a bacterium Phytoplasma australiense, which may be spread from tree to tree by a tiny sap-sucking insect, the introduced passion vine hopper.

Populations of C. australis were decimated in some parts of New Zealand because of sudden decline. In some areas, particularly in the north, no big trees are left. Although sudden decline often affects cabbage trees in farmland and open areas, trees in natural forest patches continue to do well. Trees in the southern North Island and northern South Island are generally unaffected with few dead branches and no symptoms of sudden decline. By 2010, there was evidence to suggest the severity of the disease was lessening.

=== Rural decline ===
The plight of Cordyline australis in the sudden decline epidemic drew attention to another widespread threat to the tree in rural areas throughout New Zealand. "Rural decline" was the name proposed by botanists to refer to a decline in health of older trees in pasture and grazed shrubland, leading over many years to the loss of upper branches and eventual death.

Often farmers would leave a solitary cabbage tree—or even groves of trees—standing after the swamps were drained. Most of these trees will slowly die out because livestock eat the seedlings and damage the trunks and roots of adult trees. When a cabbage tree is the only shade in a field, stock will shelter underneath it, damaging the bark by rubbing against it, and compacting the soil around the tree. Cows, sheep, goats, and deer eat the nutritious tissue under the bark of cabbage trees. Once the trunk has been damaged by animals, it seldom heals and the wounds get bigger over time. Eventually the tissue in the centre of the stem rots away and a cavity forms along its entire length. The trunk becomes misshapen or completely ring-barked for a metre above the ground. Often the growth layer dies and the injuries may lead to bacterial or fungal infections that spread into the branches until the canopy too begins to die. Other factors thought to contribute to rural decline include wood-rotting fungi like Phanerochaete cordylines, micro-organisms that cause saprobic decay, and leaf-feeding caterpillars.

Other mammals can be destructive. Possums tend not to eat the leaves of the tree but are very fond of eating the sugar-rich flowering stalks as they emerge. They also like using the tree as a sleeping place. Rabbits can be more destructive, especially during periods of drought, when they have been seen to eat through the base until a tree falls, and then eating the fallen tree completely. Horses can also fell a tree by eating through the trunk.

== Māori cultural uses ==
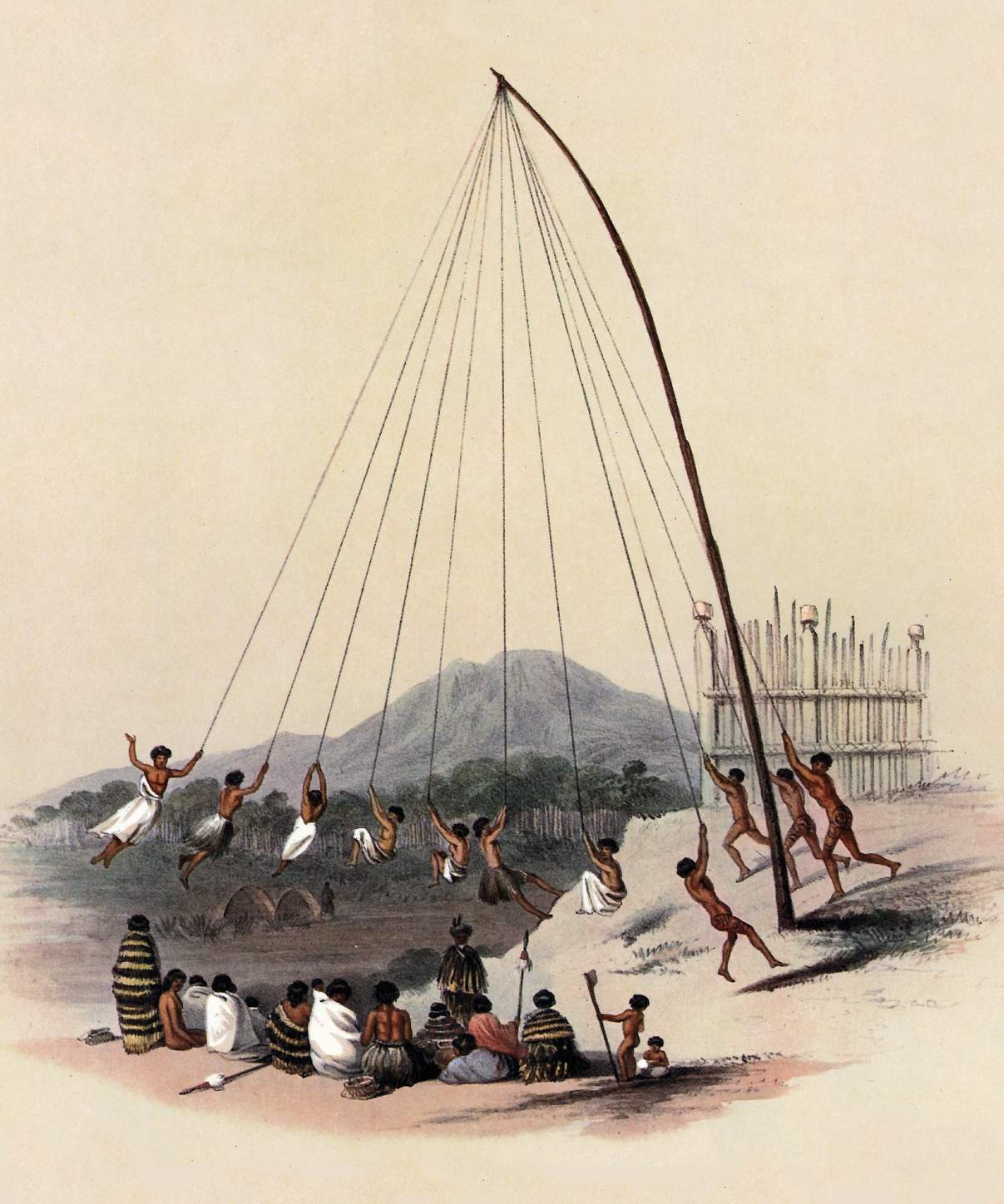
Mōrere swings provided a source of amusement for Māori children. The ropes had to be strong, so they were often made from leaves or fibre of C. australis, which were much tougher than the fibres of New Zealand flax.

In traditional times, Māori had a rich knowledge of the cabbage tree, including spiritual, ecological and many practical aspects of its use. While much of that specialised knowledge was lost after the European settlement of New Zealand, the use of the tree as food and medicine has persisted, and the use of its fibres for weaving is becoming more common.

=== Food ===
The stems and fleshy rhizomes of C. australis are high in natural sugars and were steam-cooked in earth ovens (umu tī, a large type of hāngī) to produce kāuru, a carbohydrate-rich food used to sweeten other foods. The growing tips or leaf hearts were stripped of leaves and eaten raw or cooked as a vegetable, when they were called kōuka—the origin of the Māori name of the tree. The southern limit of kūmara (sweet potato) cultivation was at Banks Peninsula at 43°S, and south of there a culture developed around C. australis. Natural and planted groves of the cabbage tree were harvested.

Large parties trimmed the cut stems and left them to dry for days or weeks. As well as stems, the rhizomes—extensions of the trunk below the surface of the ground shaped like enormous carrots—were also dug up to be cooked. In the early 1840s, Edward Shortland said Māori preferred rhizomes from trees growing in deep rich soil. They dug them in spring or early summer just before the flowering of the plant, when they were at their sweetest. November was the favourite month for preparing kāuru in the South Island.

After drying, the harvested stems or rhizomes were steamed for 24 hours or more in the umu tī pit. Steaming converted the carbohydrate fructan in the stems to very sweet fructose. The cooked stems or rhizomes were then flattened by beating and carried back to villages for storage. Kāuru could be stored dry until the time came to add it to fern root and other foods to improve their palatability. The sugar in the stems or rhizomes would be partially crystallised, and could be found mixed in a sugary pulp with other matter between the fibres of the root, which were easily separated by tearing them apart. Kāuru could also be dipped in water and chewed and was said to smell and taste like molasses.

Evidence of large cooking pits (umu tī) can still be found in the hills of South Canterbury and North Otago, where large groves of cabbage trees still stand. Europeans used the plant to make alcohol, and the often alcoholically potent brews were relished by whalers and sealers.

The kōata, the growing tip of the plant, was eaten raw as medicine. When cooked, it was called the kōuka. If the spike of unopened leaves and a few outer leaves is gripped firmly at the base and bent, it will snap off. The leaves can be removed, and what remains is like a small artichoke heart that can be steamed, roasted or boiled to make kōuka, a bitter vegetable available at any time of the year. Kōuka is delicious as a relish with fatty foods like eel, muttonbirds, or pigeons, or in modern times, pork, mutton and beef. Different trees were selected for their degree of bitterness, which should be strong for medicinal use, but less so when used as a vegetable.

=== Fibre ===
A tough fibre was extracted from the leaves of C. australis, and was valued for its strength and durability especially in seawater. The leaves are suitable for weaving in its raw state, without any need to further process the fibres. The leaves were used for making anchor ropes and fishing lines, cooking mats, baskets, sandals and leggings for protection when travelling in the South Island high country, home of the prickly speargrasses (Aciphylla) and tūmatakuru or matagouri (Discaria toumatou). Because of the water-resistant properties of the plant, the leaves were traditionally used for cooking baskets.

Mōrere swings provided a source of amusement for Māori children. The ropes had to be strong, so they were often made from the leaves or fibre of C. australis, which were much tougher than the fibres of New Zealand flax. The leaves were also used for rain capes, although the mountain cabbage tree C. indivisa, was preferred. The fibre made from cabbage tree leaves is stronger than that made from New Zealand flax.

=== Traditional medicine ===
In traditional rongoā medicinal practices, Māori used various parts of Cordyline australis to treat injuries and illnesses, either boiled up into a drink or pounded into a paste. The kōata, the growing tip of the plant, was eaten raw as a blood tonic or cleanser. Juice from the leaves was used for cuts, cracks and sores. An infusion of the leaves was taken internally for diarrhoea and used externally for bathing cuts. The leaves were rubbed until soft and applied either directly or as an ointment to cuts, skin cracks and cracked or sore hands. The young shoot was eaten by nursing mothers and given to children for colic. The liquid from boiled shoots was taken for other stomach pains. The seeds of Cordyline australis are high in linoleic acid, one of the essential fatty acids.

== Early European uses ==
Cordyline australis was the first native plant in New Zealand used by early European settlers to produce liquor. In the 1850s, distiller Owen McShane created a liquor made from Cordyline australis rhizomes, known variously as Cooper's Schnapps or McShane's Chained Lightning. McShane sold this to settlers and Māori in the lower South Island. Other early uses included woven hats worn by early settlers, and toboggans made for children.

== Cultivation today ==
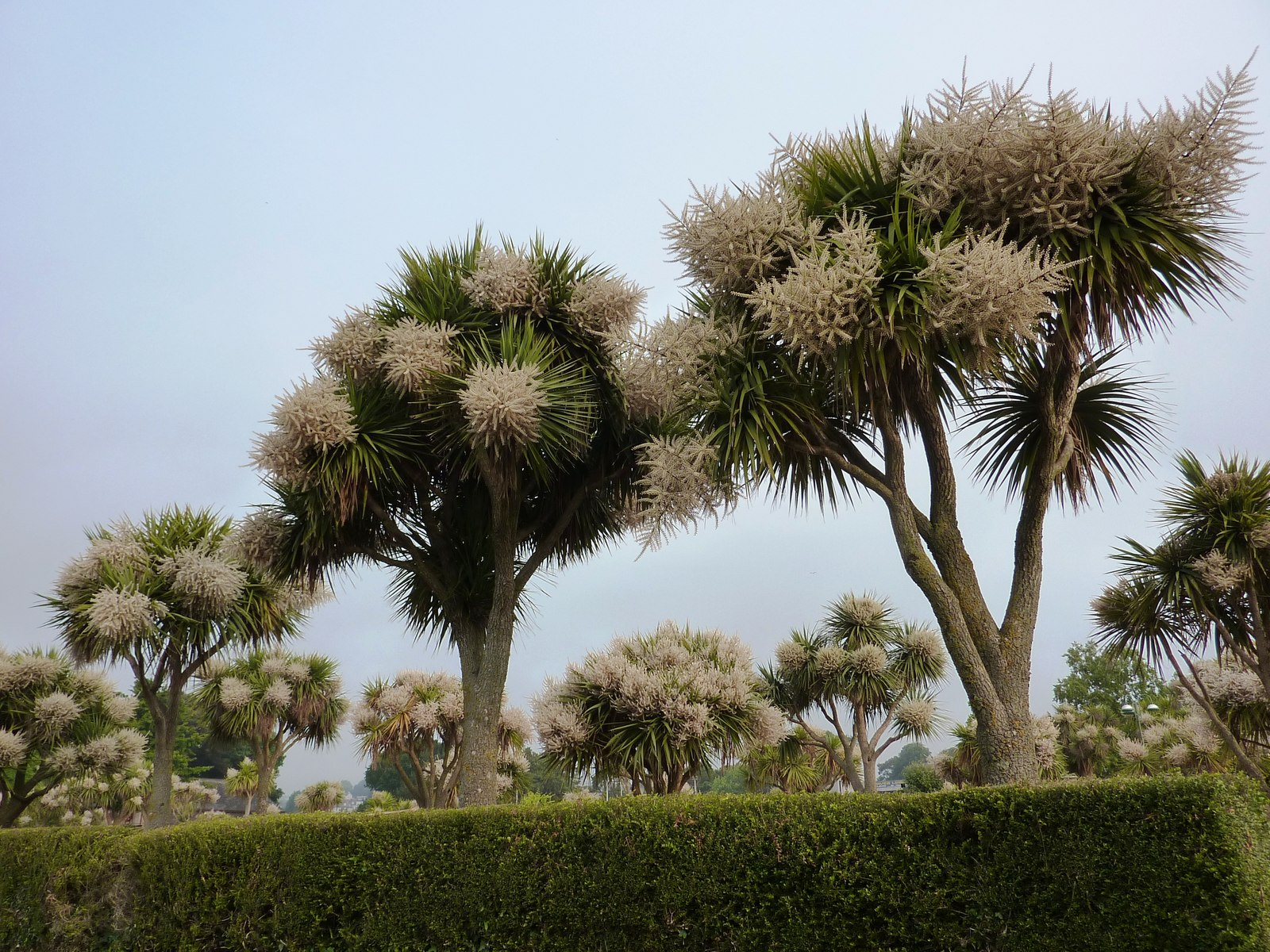
C. australis is widely cultivated outside New Zealand. Here it grows at Torquay, Devon, England.

Cordyline australis is one of the most widely cultivated New Zealand native trees. In Northwest Europe and other cool oceanic climates, it is very popular as an ornamental tree because it resembles a palm tree.Hardy forms from the coldest areas of the southern or inland South Island tolerate Northern Hemisphere conditions best, while North Island forms are much more tender. It can also be grown successfully in Mediterranean climates. It is easily grown from fresh seed — seedlings often spontaneously appear in gardens from bird-dispersed seed. It can also be propagated easily from shoot, stem and even trunk cuttings. It does well in pots and tubs.

It grows well as far north as the eastern coast of Scotland, including the village of Portgower. It is more common in Southern England and in Ireland where it is grown all over the island. Although not a palm, it is considered a "pseudo-palm", and is locally named the Cornish palm, Manx palm or Torbay palm. The last name is due to its extensive use in Torbay, it being the official symbol of that area, used in tourist posters promoting South Devon as the English Riviera. Even though its natural distribution ranges from 34° S to 46°S, and despite its ultimately subtropical origins, it also grows at about five degrees from the Arctic Circle in Masfjorden Municipality, Norway, latitude 61ºN, in a microclimate protected from arctic winds and moderated by the Gulf Stream.

=== Cultivars ===
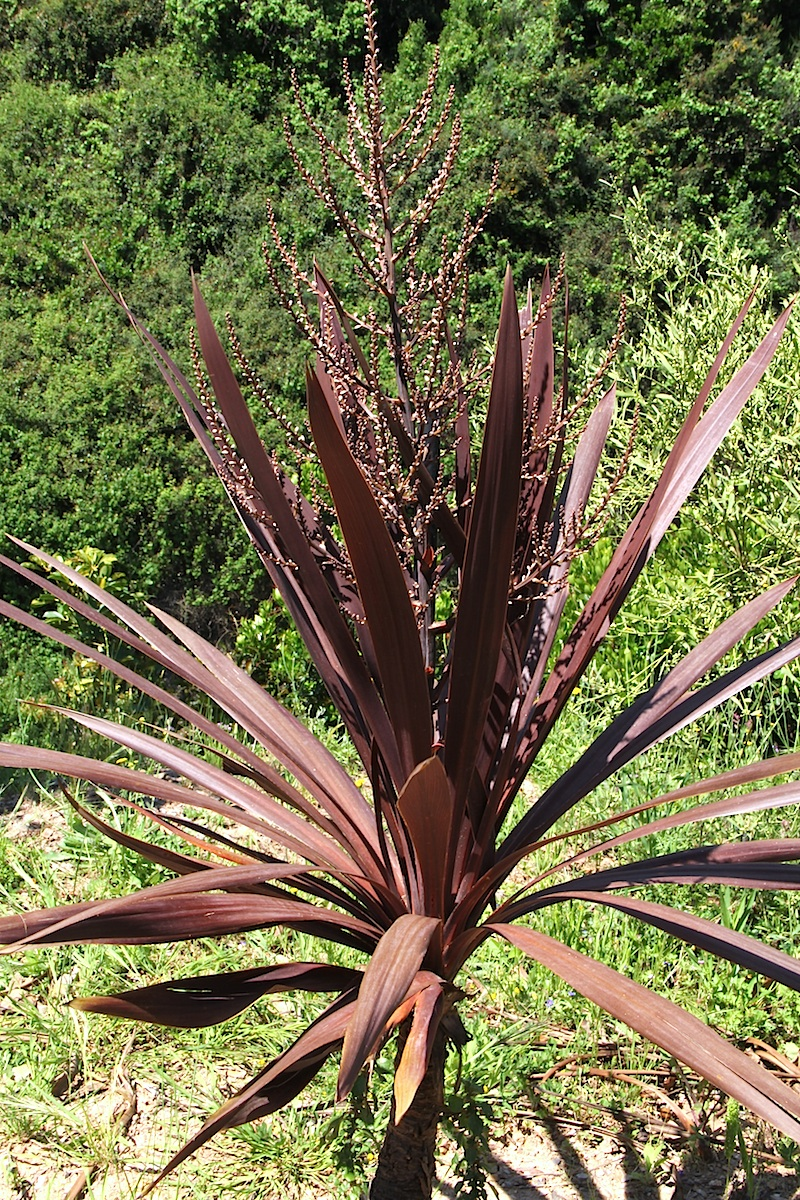
The cultivar Cordyline "Red Star" has dark reddish bronze leaves.

In the North Island, Māori cultivated selected forms of C. australis for food. One of these, called tī para or tī tāwhiti, was grown because it suckers readily and forms multiple fleshy rhizomes. A dwarf non-flowering selection of C. australis, it has a rubbery, pulpy stem, and thick green leaves. Although it was recorded by the early naturalists, botanists only rediscovered it in the 1990s, being grown by gardeners as the cultivar Cordyline 'Thomas Kirk'. Recent and unpublished DNA work suggests it derives from C. australis of the central North Island.

Cordyline 'Tī Tawhiti' was "the subject of an intense discussion amongst the leading botanists of New Zealand at a meeting of the Royal Society ... in Wellington 100 years ago. It was saved from extinction because its dwarf form found favour with gardeners and it came to be known as Cordyline 'Kirkii' recording the interest Thomas Kirk had in the plant. Its origin as a Māori selection was forgotten until rediscovered in 1991. The name 'Tawhiti' is equivalent to 'Hawaiki' and indicates the traditional belief that the plant was introduced to Aotearoa by the ancestral canoes of Māori. However, it is more probable that the name arose from it being moved around its native land as a domesticated plant."

Numerous cultivars of C. australis are sold within New Zealand and around the world. Like other Cordyline species, C. australis can produce sports which have very attractive colouration, including pink stripes and leaves in various shades of green, yellow or red. An early cultivar was published in France and England in 1870: Cordyline australis 'Lentiginosa' was described as having tinted leaves with brownish red spots. Other early cultivars included 'Veitchii' (1871) with crimson midribs, 'Atrosanguinea' (1882) with bronze leaves infused with red, 'Atropurpurea' (1886) and 'Purpurea' (1890) with purple leaves, and a range of variegated forms: 'Doucetiana' (1878), 'Argento-striata' (1888) and 'Dalleriana' (1890). In New Zealand and overseas, hybrids with other Cordyline species feature prominently in the range of cultivars available. New Plymouth plant breeders Duncan and Davies included hybrids of C. australis and C. banksii in their 1925 catalogue and have produced many new cultivars since. In New Zealand, some of the coloured forms and hybrids seem to be more susceptible to attacks from the cabbage tree moth.

Immature forms have become a popular annual house or ornamental plant under the name 'Spikes', or Dracaena 'Spikes'. To add to the confusion, these may be misidentified as Cordyline indivisa (syn. Dracaena indivisa).

C. australis is hardy to USDA zones 8–11.

For cultivation in the United Kingdom, the Royal Horticultural Society's Award of Garden Merit has been given to C. australis, 'Albertii', 'Sundance', 'Torbay Dazzler' and 'Torbay Red' (confirmed 2017).

== See also ==
- Barry L. Frankhauser, an archaeologist and anthropologist, whose Ph.D. thesis (published 1986) was a study of historical uses of the cabbage tree

== Bibliography ==
- Beever, R. E.; Forster, R. L. S.; Rees-George, J.; Robertson, G. I.; Wood, G. A.; Winks, C. J. (1996). "Sudden decline of the cabbage tree (Cordyline australis): Search for the cause" (PDF). New Zealand Journal of Ecology. 20 (1): 53–68.
- Scheele, Sue (2007). "The 2006 Banks Memorial Lecture: Cultural uses of New Zealand native plants" (PDF). New Zealand Garden Journal. 10 (2): 10–16.
- Simpson, Philip (2000). Dancing Leaves: The Story of New Zealand's Cabbage Tree, Ti Kouka. Christchurch: Canterbury University Press in association with the Department of Conservation. ISBN 0-908812-76-0.
