= Cabbage (folk song) =

"Cabbage" (Chinese:小白菜) is a Chinese folk song that originated in Hebei province, and has become popular all over Northern China.

== Lyrics ==
Chinese (Simplified)	Chinese (Traditional)	Hanyu Pinyin
小白菜呀,地里黄呀; 三两岁上呀没了娘呀. 跟着爹爹,还好过呀; 就怕爹爹娶后娘呀. 亲娘呀,亲娘呀. 娶了后娘,三年半呀; 生个弟弟比我强呀. 弟弟穿衣绫罗锻呀 我要穿衣粗布衣呀 弟弟吃面,我喝汤呀; 端起碗来泪汪汪呀. 亲娘呀,亲娘呀.	小白菜呀,地裡黃呀; 三兩歲上呀沒了娘呀. 跟著爹爹,還好過呀; 就怕爹爹娶後娘呀. 親娘呀,親娘呀. 娶了後娘,三年半呀; 生個弟弟比我強呀. 弟弟穿衣綾羅鍛呀 我要穿衣粗布衣呀 弟弟吃麵,我喝湯呀; 端起碗來淚汪汪呀. 親娘呀,親娘呀.	Xiǎo báicài ya, dì li huáng ya; Sān liǎng suì shàng ya méiliǎo niang ya. Gēnzhe diēdiē, hái hǎoguò ya; Jiù pà diēdiē qǔ hòu niáng ya. Qīn niang ya, qīn niang ya. Qǔle hòu niáng, sān nián bàn ya; Shēng gè dìdì bǐ wǒ qiáng ya. Dìdì chuān yī língluó duàn ya Wǒ yào chuān yī cū bùyī ya Dìdì chī miàn, wǒ hē tāng ya; Duān qǐ wǎn lái lèi wāngwāng ya. Qīn niang ya, qīn niang ya.
