= Cabbage (Super Junky Monkey album) =

Live album by Super Junky Monkey
- Released: 1994
- Recorded: December 16, 1993

Super Junky Monkey chronology
Cabbage (1994)	Screw Up (1995)

Cabbage (キャベツビデヲ) is the debut release from Japanese band Super Junky Monkey. It is a live recording, and was originally released by an indie label on CD in 1994, and then released as a video later that year. It features a number of songs which would later be recorded on their debut album, Screw Up.

It was recorded on December 16, 1993.

== CD track listing ==
1. "Matador"
2. "Super Junky Monkey Theme"
3. "Revenge"
4. "Find Your Self"
5. "Shower"
6. "Faster"
7. "Popo Bar"
8. "You Are Not The One"
9. "Bed Side Session"
- Tracks 3,5, and 7 were later rerecorded for their debut album, Screw Up.
