= E Kiss O =

E Kiss O is a 2001 posthumously released EP by Japanese group Super Junky Monkey. It features the material that was being worked on between the previous release and singer Mutsumi's death. It contained mostly instrumental tracks, and one cover song.

== Track listing ==
1. "Shaved Women" (Crass cover)
2. "E•Kiss•O"
3. "A.B.C."
4. "Yattemae"
5. "Towering Man"
