= A.I.E.T.O.H. =

AIETOH

EP by Super Junky Monkey
- Released: 1995
- Label: Sony

AIETOH is a 1995 EP by Japanese group Super Junky Monkey. It showcased their fusion of rap, hardcore, punk, and funk music. It was released only in Japan.

== Track listing ==
1. "A•I•E•T•O•H"
2. "Fuck That Noise"
3. "Time Is Culture"
4. "Blah, Blah, Blah"

== Personnel ==
- Mutsumi ‘623’ Fukuhara – vocals
- Keiko – guitar
- Shinobu Kawai – bass
- Matsudaaahh – drums
