= Portgower =

Coordinates: 58.09883°N 3.68401°W

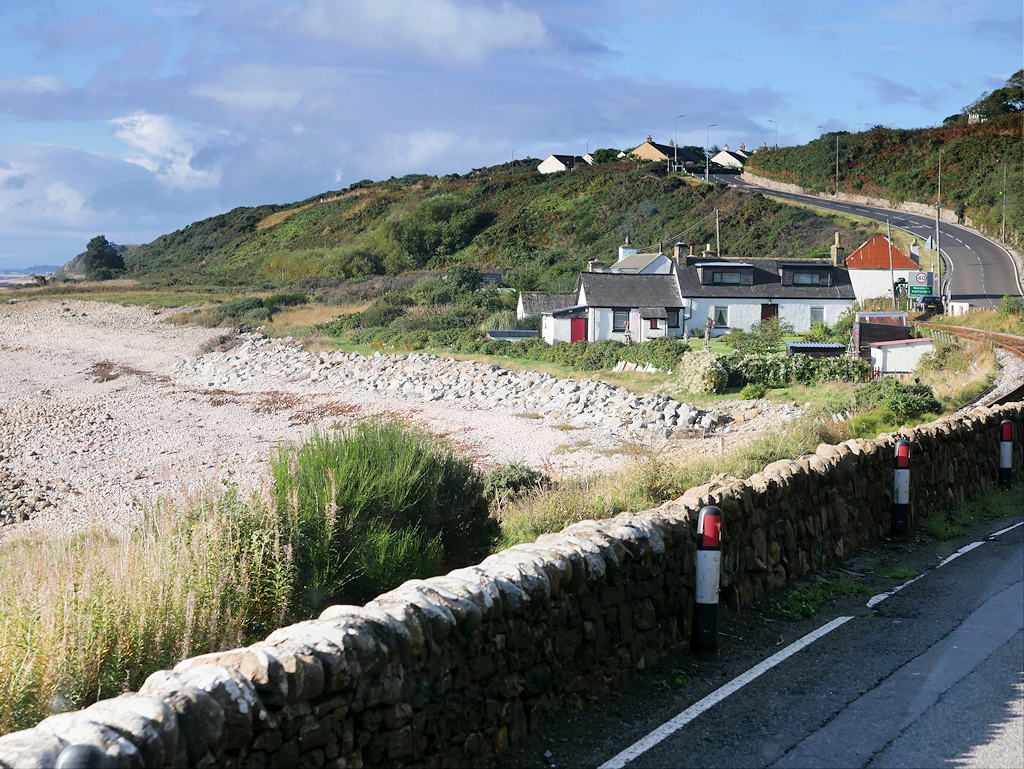
- The coast at Portgower

- Location within the Highland council area
- OS grid reference: ND008134
- Council area: Highland
- Lieutenancy area: Sutherland
- Country: Scotland
- Sovereign state: United Kingdom
- Postcode district: KW8 6
- Police: Scotland
- Fire: Scottish
- Ambulance: Scottish

Portgower is a former fishing village with an inn in the parish of Loth on the east coast of Scotland near Helmsdale, Sutherland, the Scottish Highlands and is in the Scottish council area of the Highlands.
