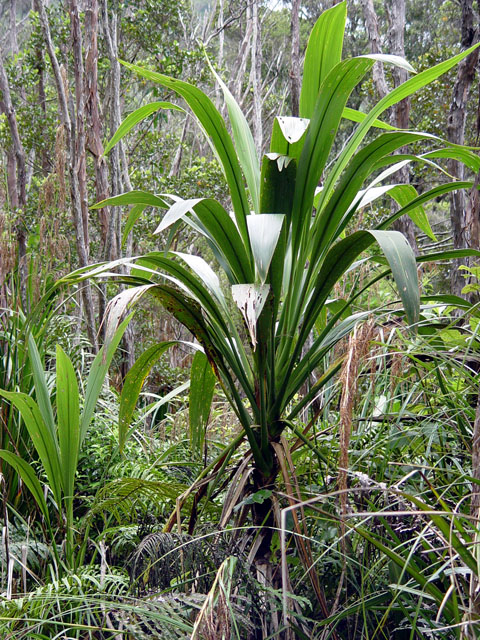
- Cordyline banksii, Kauaeranga Valley

Scientific classification
- Kingdom: Plantae
- Clade: Tracheophytes
- Clade: Angiosperms
- Clade: Monocots
- Order: Asparagales
- Family: Asparagaceae
- Subfamily: Lomandroideae
- Genus: Cordyline
- Species: C. banksii

Binomial name
- Cordyline banksii Hook.f.
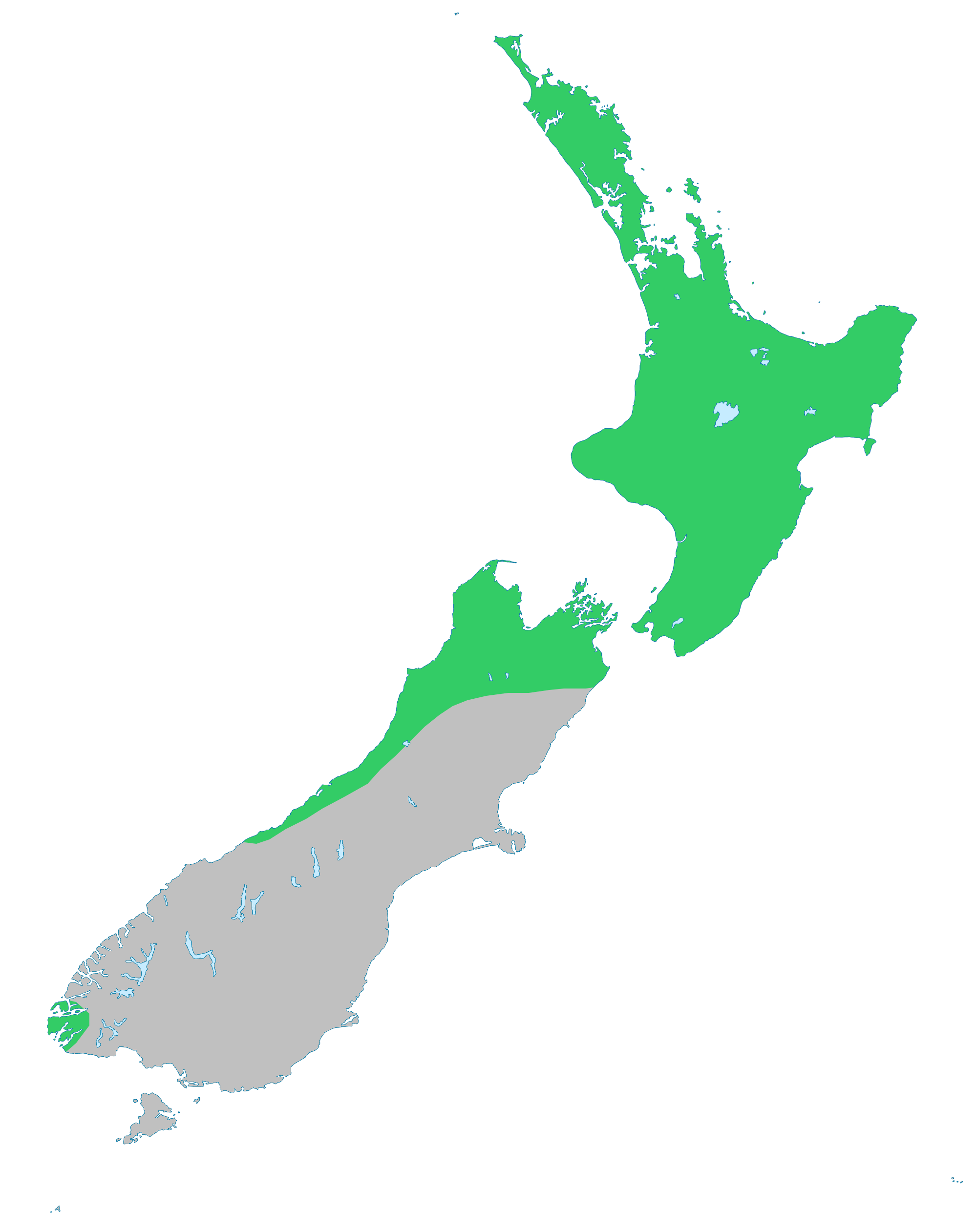
- Natural range of C. banksii

Synonyms
- Cordyline diffusa Colenso.

= Cordyline banksii =

Species of tree

Cordyline banksii, commonly known as the forest cabbage tree or by its Māori name tī ngahere, is a monocot tree endemic to New Zealand. The specific epithet banksii refers to the 18th-century botanist Joseph Banks.

== Distribution ==
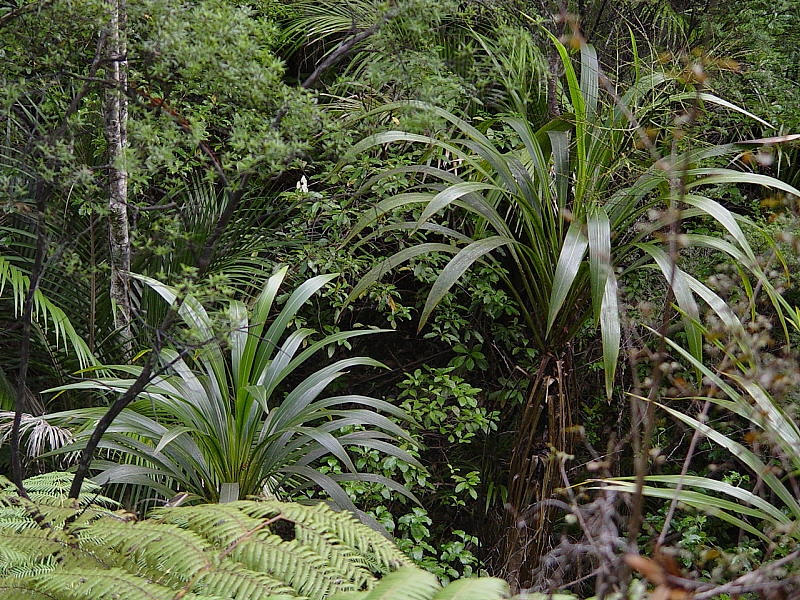
Graceful C. banksii growing in dense kauri forest, Aupōuri Peninsula, Northland

Cordyline banksii tolerates a wide variety of habitats. It is common in coastal, lowland, and lower montane forests in the North Island, widespread in the northern half of the South Island and Westland as far south as Haast. It has occasionally been reported from coastal Fiordland, but these sightings are unsubstantiated. It also occasionally occurs in subalpine regions in the South Island. In shrublands it occurs with Cordyline pumilio and may form hybrids with it.

== Description ==
Tī ngahere is a sparingly-branched cabbage tree up to 4 metres (13 ft) tall. The leaves are lanceolate (somewhat paddle-shaped), up to 2 metres (6 ft 7 in) long and from 40–80 millimetres (1.6–3.1 in) wide. The leaves are broad in the mid portion and droop from there. A prominent flat midrib runs the whole length of the leaf. The fruiting panicle is up to 2 metres in length. The flowers are white and pleasantly perfumed. The globe-shaped fruit are up to 5 millimetres (0.20 in) in diameter, and are white, bluish-white, or blue.

== Threats ==
C. banksii is not regarded as threatened. Unlike C. australis it seems to be resistant to a disease called "sudden decline", caused by the pathogen Phytoplasma australiense.

== Cultivation ==
C. banksii is easy to grow. Fresh seed takes readily, and cuttings taken from the stems and trunk and shoots root quickly. It is rarer in cultivation than C. australis but is available from many nurseries and garden centres, often as a purple-leaved cultivar. Useful for steep slopes or poorly drained situations. The plant is hardy in USDA zones 10a and 11.
