= Parasitic People =

Studio album by Super Junky Monkey
- Released: April 21, 1996
- Genre: Avant-garde metal, funk metal
- Label: Sony

Super Junky Monkey chronology
A.I.E.T.O.H. (1995)	Parasitic People (1996)	Super Junky Alien (1996)

Parasitic People is the second album Japanese group Super Junky Monkey, released in 1996. It showed the group honing and integrating their influences into a very complex and (to some) unlistenable recording. It was released in Japan and the United States.

== Track listing ==
1. Introduction
2. The Words
3. If
4. Parasitic People
5. Gokai (Misunderstanding)
6. Our Universe
7. Nani (What)
8. Telepathy
9. Start With Makin’ A Fire
10. Burn System’s Flag
11. Kappa
12. The True Parasites
13. See Me, Feel Me
14. New Song
15. Tairiku No Kodoh (Pulsation’s Continent)
