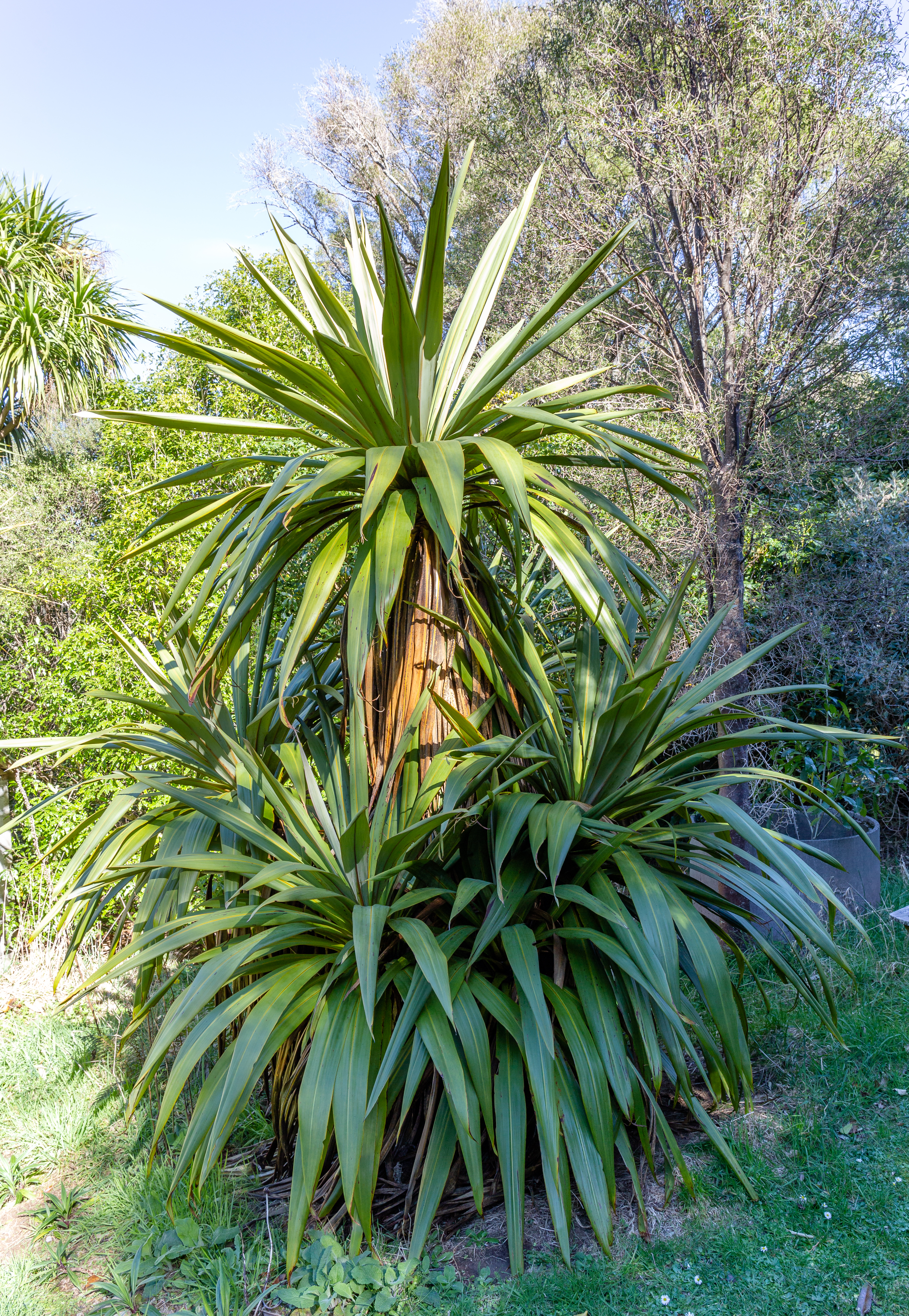
- A mature Cordyline indivisa in Hinewai Reserve

Scientific classification
- Kingdom: Plantae
- Clade: Tracheophytes
- Clade: Angiosperms
- Clade: Monocots
- Order: Asparagales
- Family: Asparagaceae
- Subfamily: Lomandroideae
- Genus: Cordyline
- Species: C. indivisa

Binomial name
- Cordyline indivisa (G.Forst.) Steud.
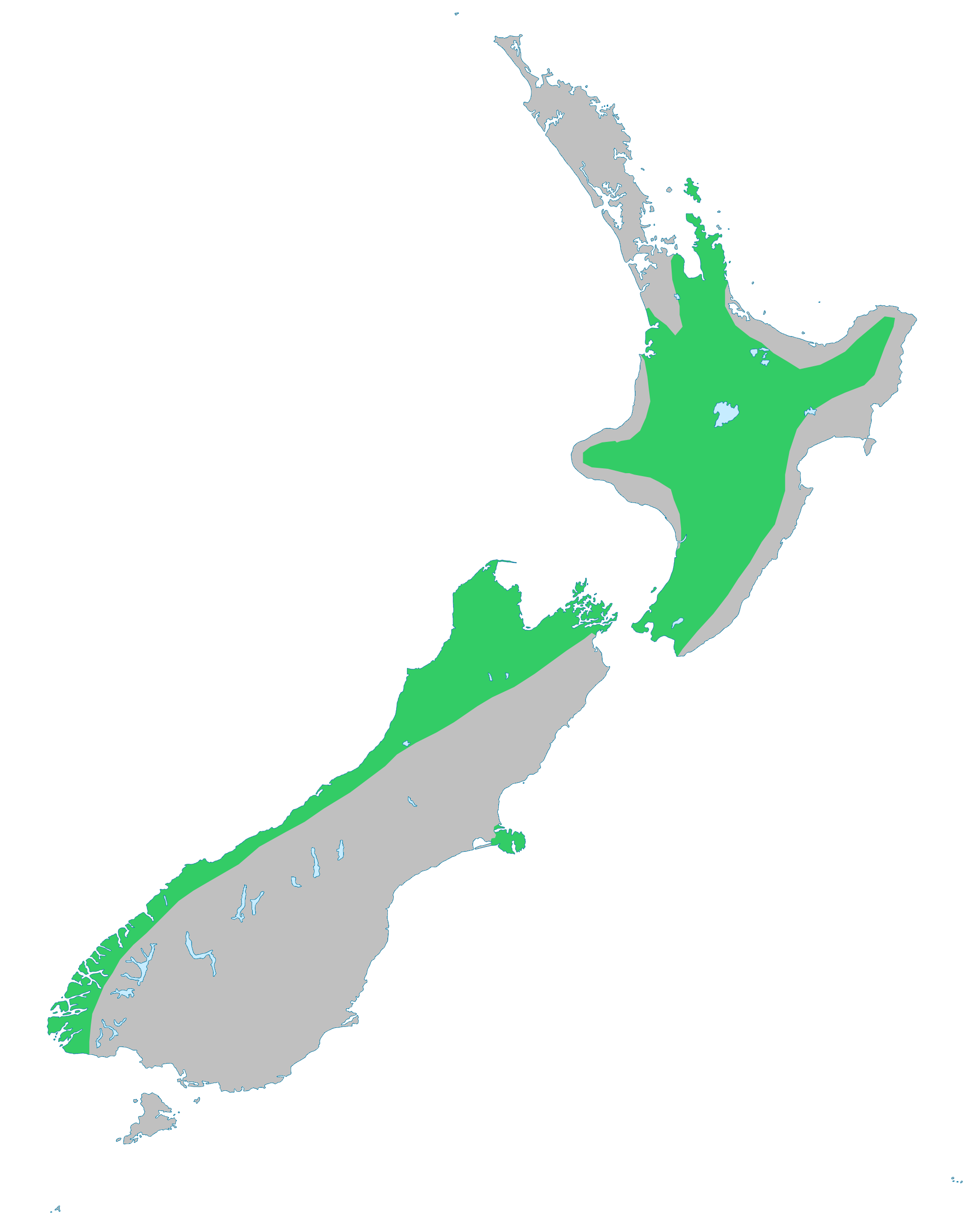
- Natural range of C. indivisa

Synonyms
- Dracaena indivisa Dracaenopsis indivisa Cordyline hookeri Cordyline hectori

= Cordyline indivisa =

Species of tree endemic to New Zealand

Cordyline indivisa is a monocot tree endemic to New Zealand. It is commonly known as mountain cabbage tree or bush flax. It is also known as the broad-leaved cabbage tree, and in the Māori language as tōī.

== Distribution ==
In the North Island, Cordyline indivisa occurs from south of Kohukohunui in the Hunua Ranges and Te Moehau (Coromandel Peninsula) but becomes common only south of Raukūmara Ranges and the central Volcanic Plateau. In the South Island it is widespread and common along the north and western portions of the island, but occurs more locally in the drier eastern regions.

== Description ==
C. indivisa is very distinctive. The species can be distinguished from all other Cordyline species by its very broad blue-grey leaves, and its smaller, tightly compacted inflorescence which is produced from beneath the foliage. It forms a stout tree up to 8 metres (26 ft) tall, with a trunk from 40–80 centimetres (1 ft 4 in – 2 ft 7 in) in diameter. The stem is usually unbranched, or has very few branches. The leaves are 1–2 metres (3 ft 3 in – 6 ft 7 in) long, and from 10–30 centimetres (3.9–11.8 in) wide. The foliage, which droops with age, is blue-green and shaped like a broad sword, with a broad and conspicuous midrib which is often tinged red, orange red or golden. The inflorescence is a panicle that arises from the base of the growing points underneath the leaves.

== Conservation ==
The mountain cabbage tree is not regarded as threatened. Nonetheless, some northern populations have been greatly reduced by livestock and goats, which are thought to have caused its local extinction on Mount Moehau at the northern tip of the Coromandel Peninsula. Since 1987, some species of Cordyline in New Zealand have been affected by a disease called "Sudden Decline", caused by the pathogen Phytoplasma australiense. The sudden death of some specimens of C. indivisa in cultivation and in the wild has been attributed to this disease, but it is still not clear if this was in fact the case.

== Māori cultural use ==
The fronds of Cordyline indivisa were prized in traditional Māori weaving as a fibre to create rain capes, better suited to the task than other Cordyline species due to the plant's wider leaves.

== Cultivation ==
It is a very attractive tree, but it has a tendency to collapse suddenly during high temperatures or in times of water shortage. It prefers cool moist soils, and semi-shade, and is easy to grow in the cooler parts of New Zealand. North of Hamilton, it can only be grown with great difficulty but few plants survive long enough to flower in lowland areas.

== Nomenclature ==
C. indivisa may be confused with another cabbage tree, Cordyline australis. In particular the popular annual house or ornamental plant, sold under the common name "Spikes" or "Dracaena Spikes", which is an immature form of C. australis, is incorrectly sold as Cordyline indivisa or Dracaena indivisa. (Dracaena is a closely related genus from which some species have been reclassified as Cordyline.)
