= Narrow-leaved palm lily =

Narrow-leaved palm lily may apply to at least two plant species in the genus Cordyline:

- Cordyline congesta
- Cordyline stricta
