= S. metallica =

S. metallica may refer to:

- Sabera metallica, a butterfly species found in Papua, Indonesia, on New Guinea
- Somatochlora metallica, the brilliant emerald, a dragonfly species

== See also ==
- Metallica (disambiguation)
