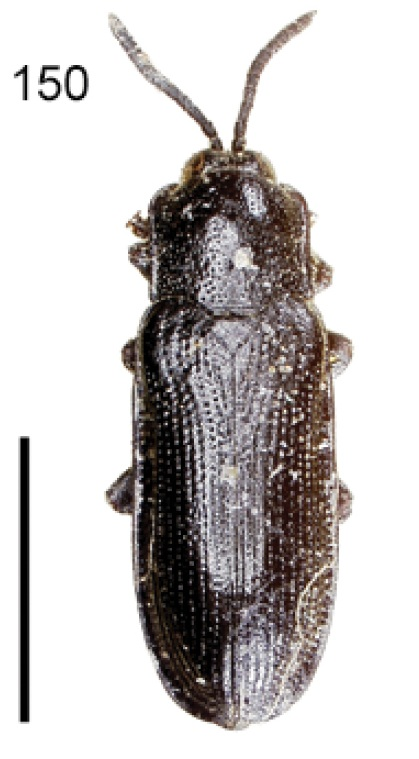

Scientific classification
- Kingdom: Animalia
- Phylum: Arthropoda
- Class: Insecta
- Order: Coleoptera
- Suborder: Polyphaga
- Infraorder: Cucujiformia
- Family: Chrysomelidae
- Genus: Cephaloleia
- Species: C. funesta

Binomial name
- Cephaloleia funesta Baly, 1858

Synonyms
- Cephaloleia handschini Uhmann, 1948

= Cephaloleia funesta =

Species of beetle

Cephaloleia funesta is a species of beetle in the family Chrysomelidae. It is found in Argentina, Bolivia, Brazil (Rio de Janeiro, Santa Catharina) and Paraguay.

== Description ==
Adults reach a length of about 5.7–6.1 mm. Adults are shining black, with the basal palpomeres lighter.

== Biology ==
The recorded host plants for this species are Canna species, Maranta divaricata, Pharus glaber, as well as Cordyline species.
