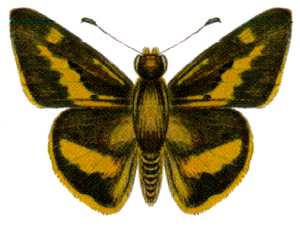
- Sabera dobboe autoleon

Scientific classification
- Kingdom: Animalia
- Phylum: Arthropoda
- Class: Insecta
- Order: Lepidoptera
- Family: Hesperiidae
- Genus: Sabera
- Species: S. dobboe

Binomial name
- Sabera dobboe (Plötz, 1883)

Synonyms
- Pamphila autoleon Miskin, 1889

= Sabera dobboe =

Species of butterfly

Sabera dobboe, the yellow-streaked swift or Miskin's swift, is a butterfly of the family Hesperiidae. It is found in Australia in Queensland, Papua New Guinea and Indonesia in the Aru Islands, Papua and the Kei Islands.

The wingspan is about 30 mm.

The larvae feed on Cordyline terminalis, Cordyline australis, Cordyline stricta and Cordyline cannifolia.

== Subspecies ==
- Sabera dobboe dobboe (Papua New Guinea)
- Sabera dobboe autoleon (Miskin, 1889) - Miskin's swift (northern Gulf and north-eastern coast of Queensland)
- Sabera dobboe hanova Evans, 1949 (northern New Britain and New Ireland on Papua New Guinea)
