= Leioproctus doreyi =

Scientific classification
- Kingdom: Animalia
- Phylum: Arthropoda
- Clade: Pancrustacea
- Class: Insecta
- Order: Hymenoptera
- Family: Colletidae
- Genus: Leioproctus
- Species: L. doreyi

Binomial name
- Leioproctus doreyi Batley, 2023

Species of bee

Leioproctus doreyi, or Leioproctus (Exleycolletes) doreyi, is a species of bee in the family Colletidae and subfamily Colletinae. It is endemic to Australia. It was described by entomologist Michael Batley in 2023.

== Etymology ==
The specific epithet doreyi honours entomologist James Dorey "for his sustained and enthusiastic promotion of Australian bees".

== Description ==
Female holotype body length is 11.2 mm, wing length 7.4 mm, head width 3.0 mm; male body length 9.9 mm, wing length 6.9 mm, head width 2.8 mm. Integumental colouration is mainly black. The hair on head and thorax of the female is bright orange, that of the male paler.

== Distribution and habitat ==
The species occurs in coastal eastern Australia. The type locality is Tintenbar, New South Wales.

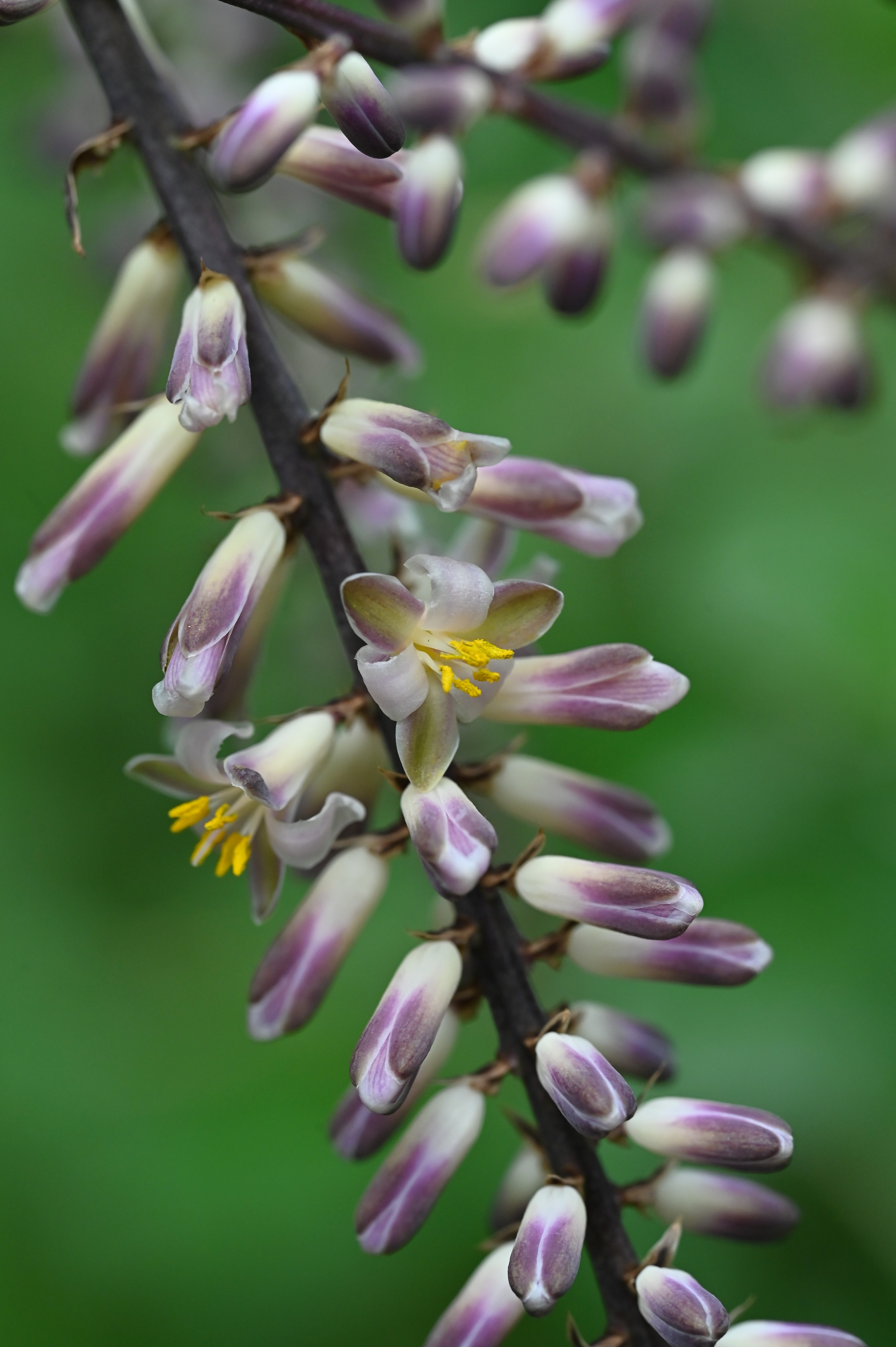
Cordyline stricta flowers

== Behaviour ==
The adults are flying mellivores. Flowering plants visited by the bees include Cordyline stricta.

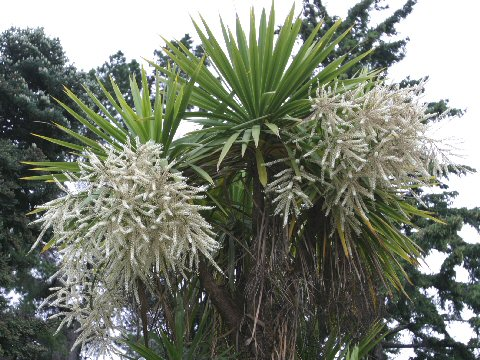
Cordyline stricta (slender palm lily), a forage plant of the bees
