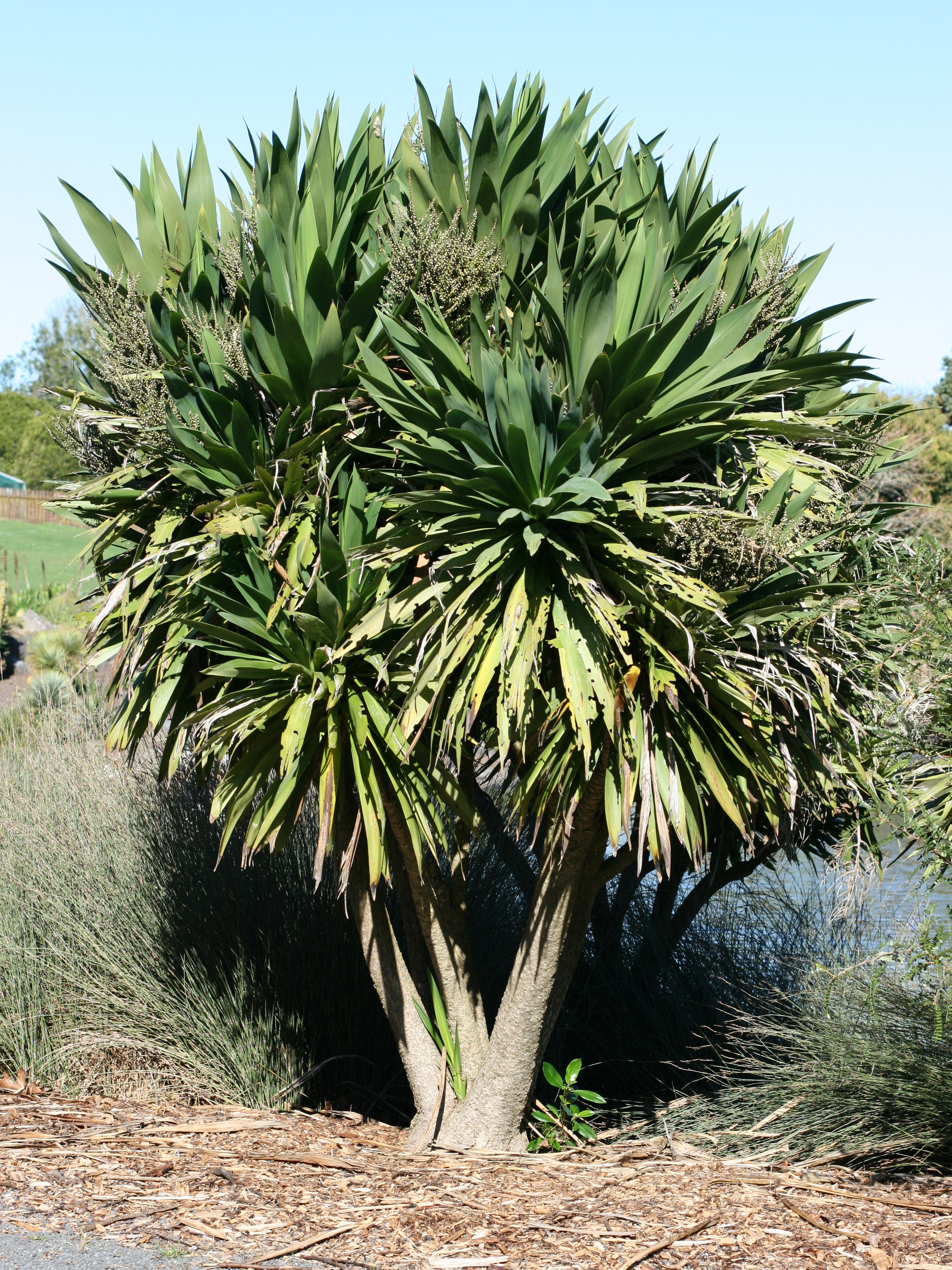

Scientific classification
- Kingdom: Plantae
- Clade: Tracheophytes
- Clade: Angiosperms
- Clade: Monocots
- Order: Asparagales
- Family: Asparagaceae
- Subfamily: Lomandroideae
- Genus: Cordyline
- Species: C. obtecta

Binomial name
- Cordyline obtecta (Graham) Baker
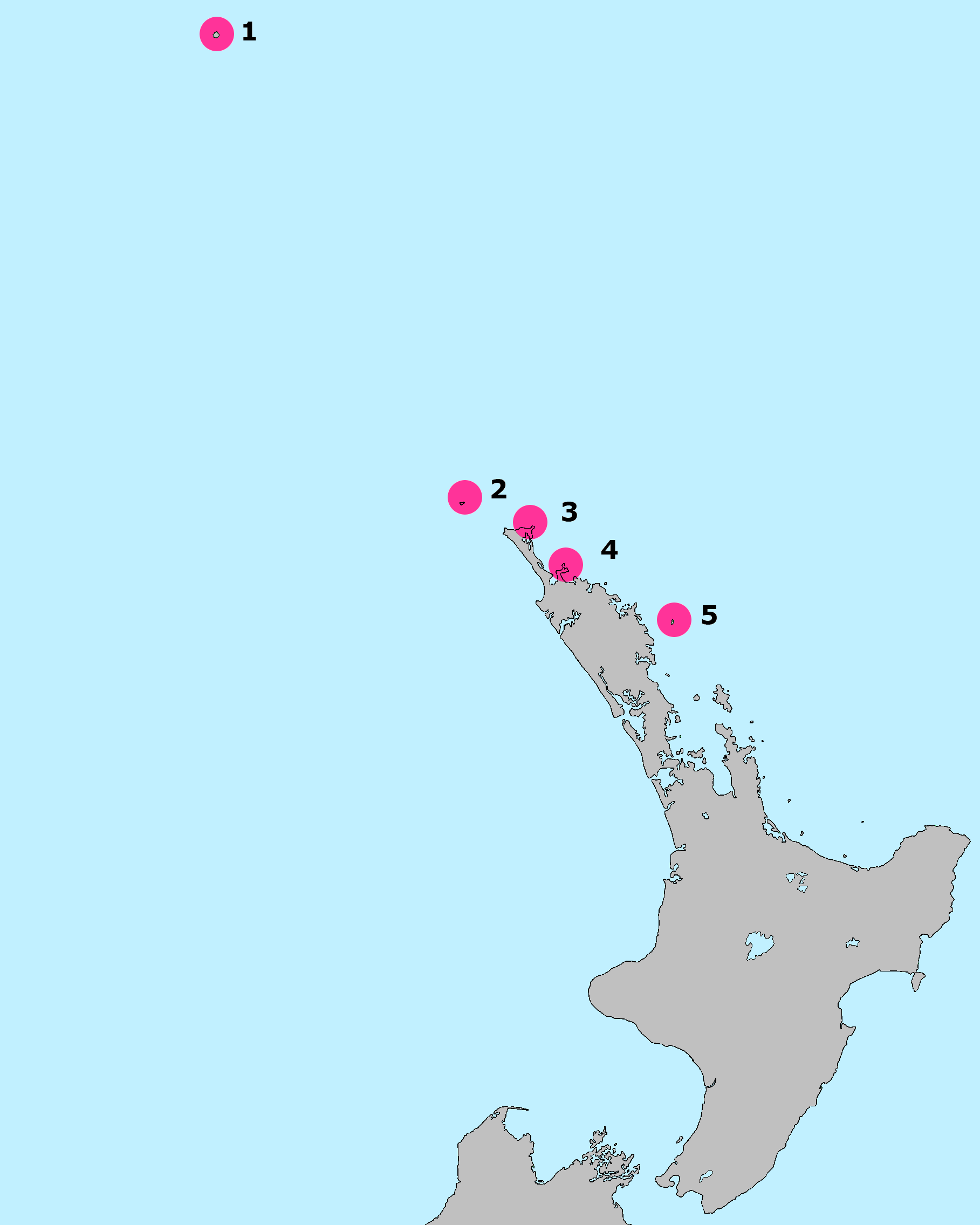
- Natural range of C. obtecta （red）

Synonyms
- Cordyline baueri Hook.f. nom. illeg Cordyline kaspar W.R.B.Oliv.

= Cordyline obtecta =

Species of plant

Cordyline obtecta (Ti, Norfolk Island cabbage tree, Three Kings cabbage tree) is a widely branching monocot tree native to Norfolk Island (the type locality), and to northern New Zealand. The species name obtecta derives from the Latin obtegere (to conceal, to cover up), alluding to the way the inflorescence barely protruded beyond the leaves in the plant first described.

== Distribution ==
On Norfolk Island, C. obtecta grows in forest on Mt Bates, Mt Pitt, and elsewhere in the National Park. In New Zealand it was first described as C. kaspar and was thought to be restricted to the Three Kings Islands, 55 km north of the North Island. Later it was found on the North Island at North Cape, and on Murimotu Island and the Poor Knights Islands. In 2005, C. kaspar was relegated to synonymy with C. obtecta.

== Description ==
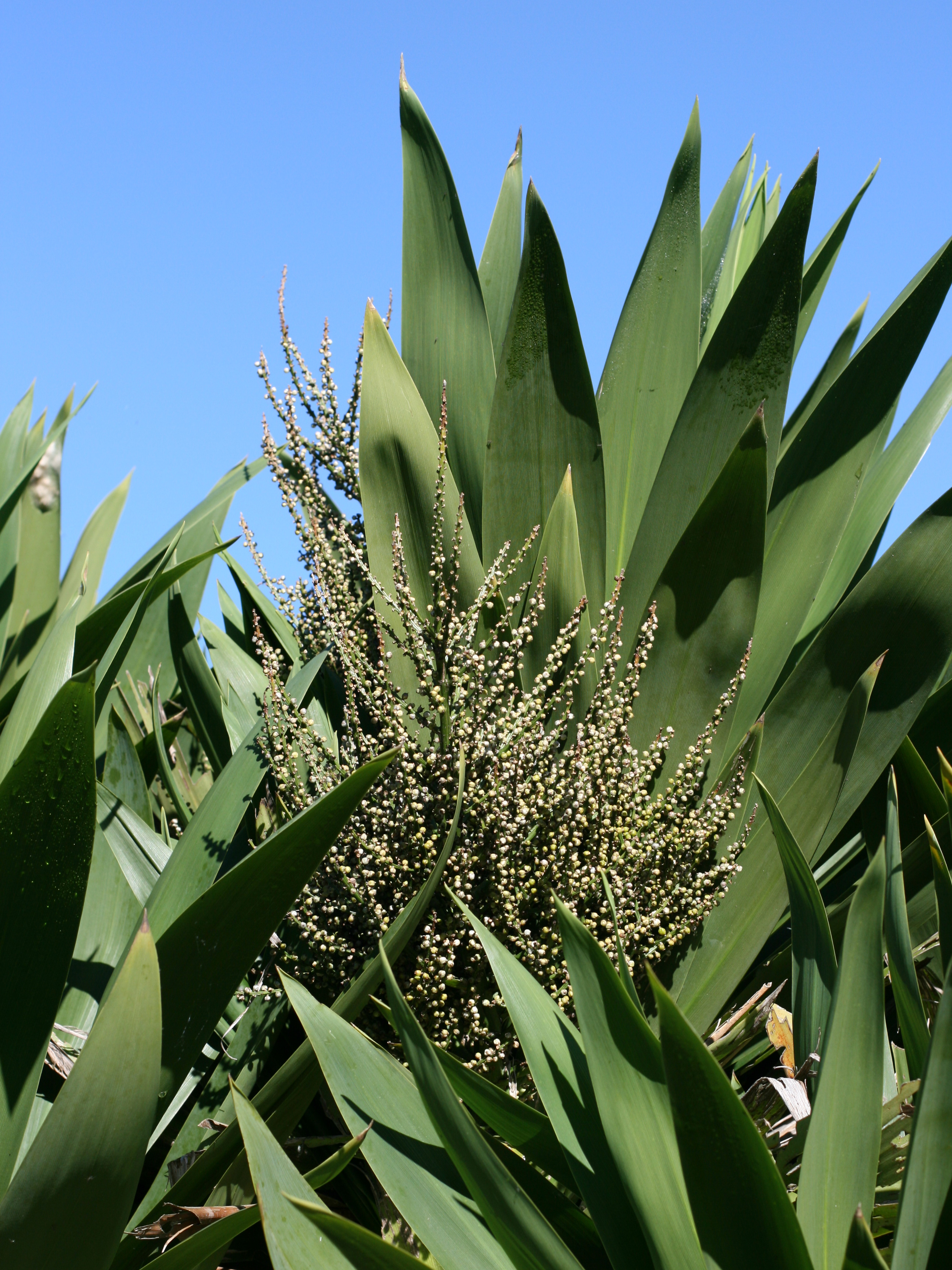
Foliage and fruiting panicle of Cordyline obtecta

C. obtecta is a cabbage tree up to 10 metres (33 ft) tall (generally much less), with a stout trunk 20–30 centimetres (7.9–11.8 in) in diameter. It has spreading branches covered with densely clustered stiff leaves that appear in tufts at the tips of the branches. The leaves are 35–100 cm (14–39 in) long, and 2.5–7 cm (1.0–2.8 in) wide, narrowing towards their bases into short leaf stems about 2.5–3.5 cm (1.0–1.4 in) wide. The leaves droop somewhat as they age. The flowers of C. obtecta are borne in many large, open branched panicles that appear among the leaves. The flowers are each about 1 mm (0.04 in) in diameter, and are very strongly scented. The fruit is a spherical berry 4–5 mm (0.16–0.20 in) in diameter, whitish or purplish blue. The bark on the trunk is grey and flaky.

== Threats ==
On Norfolk Island many populations of C. obtecta are threatened outside the national park, and it is listed as 'vulnerable' under the Australian Environment Protection and Biodiversity Conservation Act 1999 The New Zealand Plant Conservation Network lists the plant as 'At Risk/Range Restricted'. It also occasionally hybridises in New Zealand with C. australis, the characteristics of the resultant plants being intermediate to those of the parents.

== Cultivation ==
C. obtecta is an attractive small tree which tolerates full sun but prefers shade when young. It is intolerant of wet conditions and is likely to be sensitive to frost. There are at least three commercially available cultivars, which are becoming popular for street planting and for home gardens. 'Green Goddess' (probably of Three Kings origin) has slightly glaucous, matte-surfaced leaves and stiffly upright fruit panicles. 'Emerald Goddess' (probably from Norfolk Island) has glossy grass-green leaves and lax panicles. 'Superstar Albatross' has glossy, dark red leaves.
