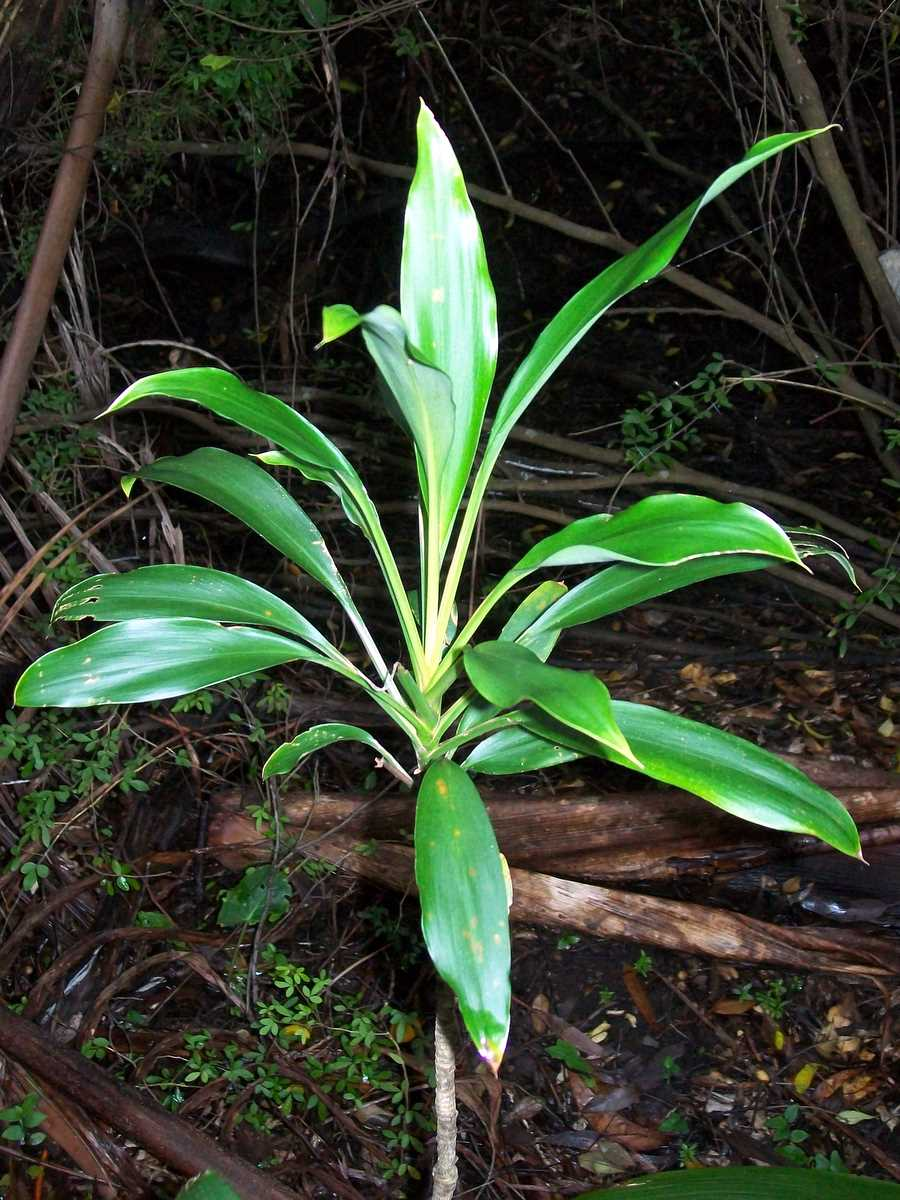

Scientific classification
- Kingdom: Plantae
- Clade: Tracheophytes
- Clade: Angiosperms
- Clade: Monocots
- Order: Asparagales
- Family: Asparagaceae
- Subfamily: Lomandroideae
- Genus: Cordyline
- Species: C. rubra

Binomial name
- Cordyline rubra Otto & A.Dietr.

Synonyms
- Terminalis rubra (Otto & A.Dietr.) Kuntze

= Cordyline rubra =

Species of flowering plant

Cordyline rubra, known as the palm lily, is an evergreen Australian plant. Growing as a shrub to around 4 metres (13 ft) tall, it is found in warm rainforest and moist eucalyptus forest. The range of natural distribution is from Lismore to near Bundaberg, Queensland.

It was first described by the German botanists Christoph Friedrich Otto and Albert Gottfried Dietrich in 1848. The Latin species name rubra means "red".

Cordyline rubra is mainly identified by the leaf stems, which grow from 5 to 20 cm (2–8 in) long. They are flat or somewhat concave in shape. The leaves 15 to 50 cm (6–20 in) long, and 3 to 5.5 cm (1.4–2.2 in) wide, narrow elliptic in shape. Flowering occurs from summer, being lilac in colour. The fruit is a bright red berry, 10 mm (0.4 in) in diameter. It grows on panicles 10 to 40 cm (4–16 in) long.

This species propagates easily from seeds or stem cuttings. Cordyline rubra is not as widely seen in cultivation as C. australis, however it is also well suited to gardens with moist soils in semi shade. It is a resilient plant and can tolerate neglect. Also suited as an indoor pot plant. Occasionally it hybridizes with Cordyline petiolaris in the wild.
