= Cordyline minutiflora =

Scientific classification
- Kingdom: Plantae
- Clade: Tracheophytes
- Clade: Angiosperms
- Clade: Monocots
- Order: Asparagales
- Family: Asparagaceae
- Subfamily: Lomandroideae
- Genus: Cordyline
- Species: C. minutiflora

Binomial name
- Cordyline minutiflora Ridl.

Species of flowering plant

Cordyline minutiflora is a plant species native to Irian Jaya on the island of New Guinea in eastern Indonesia. Type specimen was collected there in 1912 at an elevation of approximately 210 m (700 feet).

Cordyline minutiflora has linear, acuminate leaves up to 20 cm (8 inches) long and 1 cm (0.4 inches) wide. Flowers are borne in a panicle up to 15 cm (6 inches) long; each flower is small, no more than 2 mm (0.08 inches) long on a pedicel 1 mm (0.04 inches) long.
