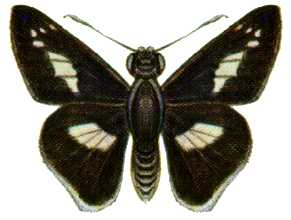
- Sabera caesina albifascia

Scientific classification
- Kingdom: Animalia
- Phylum: Arthropoda
- Class: Insecta
- Order: Lepidoptera
- Family: Hesperiidae
- Genus: Sabera
- Species: S. caesina

Binomial name
- Sabera caesina (Hewitson, 1886)

Synonyms
- Pamphila albifascia Miskin, 1889

= Sabera caesina =

Species of butterfly

Sabera caesina, the white-clubbed swift or black and white swift, is a butterfly of the family Hesperiidae. It is found in Australia in Queensland, Papua New Guinea, and in Indonesia in the Aru Islands and Papua.

The wingspan is about 30 mm.

The larvae of subspecies S. c. albifascia feed on Archontophoenix alexandrae, Normanbya normanbyi and Calamus caryotoides. S. c. barina probably feeds on Licula or Calamus species.

== Subspecies ==
- Sabera caesina caesina
- Sabera caesina albifascia (Miskin, 1889) - black and white swift (northern Gulf and north-eastern coast of Queensland)
- Sabera caesina barina Fruhstorfer, 1910 (Papua New Guinea)
