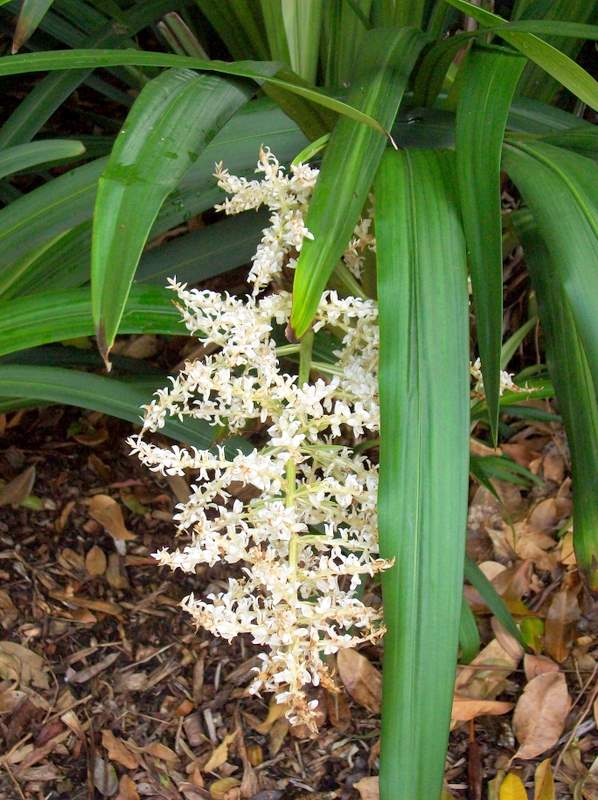
- Cordyline congesta at the Royal Botanic Gardens, Sydney

Conservation status
- Vulnerable (EPBC Act)

Scientific classification
- Kingdom: Plantae
- Clade: Tracheophytes
- Clade: Angiosperms
- Clade: Monocots
- Order: Asparagales
- Family: Asparagaceae
- Subfamily: Lomandroideae
- Genus: Cordyline
- Species: C. congesta

Binomial name
- Cordyline congesta (Sweet) Steud.

Synonyms
- Charlwoodia congesta Sweet (basionym); Charlwoodia angustifolia (Kunth) Göpp.; Cordyline stricta var. rigidifolia (K.Koch) Asch. & Graebn.

= Cordyline congesta =

Species of flowering plant

Cordyline congesta, often referred to as narrow-leaved palm lily, is an evergreen Australian plant. It is a rare shrub that grows up to 3 meters (9 feet 10 inches) tall and was discovered on the margins of a rainforest, and in riverine scrub and moist gullies in eucalyptus forest. Growing north from the Clarence River, New South Wales.

Leaves long and thin to lanceolate. Up to 65 centimetres (2 ft 2 in) long by 4 centimetres (1.6 in), with stiff marginal teeth near the base of leaf; leaf stem up to 15 centimetres (5.9 in) long. Small white to mauve flowers form on panicles. Flowering occurs from September to October. Fruit an orange-red berry, 10–15 millimetres (0.39–0.59 in) in diameter, ripening from December to March. This species propagates easily from seeds, suckers or stem cuttings.

Similar to Cordyline stricta and C. rubra; however, C. congesta has jagged, fringed or scalloped leaf margins, particularly near the leaf base.
