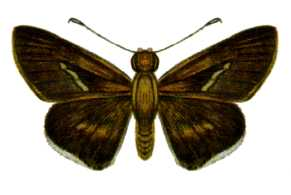

Scientific classification
- Kingdom: Animalia
- Phylum: Arthropoda
- Class: Insecta
- Order: Lepidoptera
- Family: Hesperiidae
- Genus: Sabera
- Species: S. fuliginosa

Binomial name
- Sabera fuliginosa (Miskin, 1889)

Synonyms
- Pamphila fuliginosa Miskin, 1889; Telesto bicolor Rothschild, 1915

= Sabera fuliginosa =

Species of butterfly

Sabera fuliginosa, the white-fringed swift, is a butterfly of the family Hesperiidae. It is found in Australia along the north-east coast of Queensland, as well as in Papua, Indonesia, and Papua New Guinea.

The wingspan is about 40 mm.

The larvae feed on Calamus moti.

== Subspecies ==
- Sabera fuliginosa fuliginosa (Queensland)
- Sabera fuliginosa chota (New Guinea)
