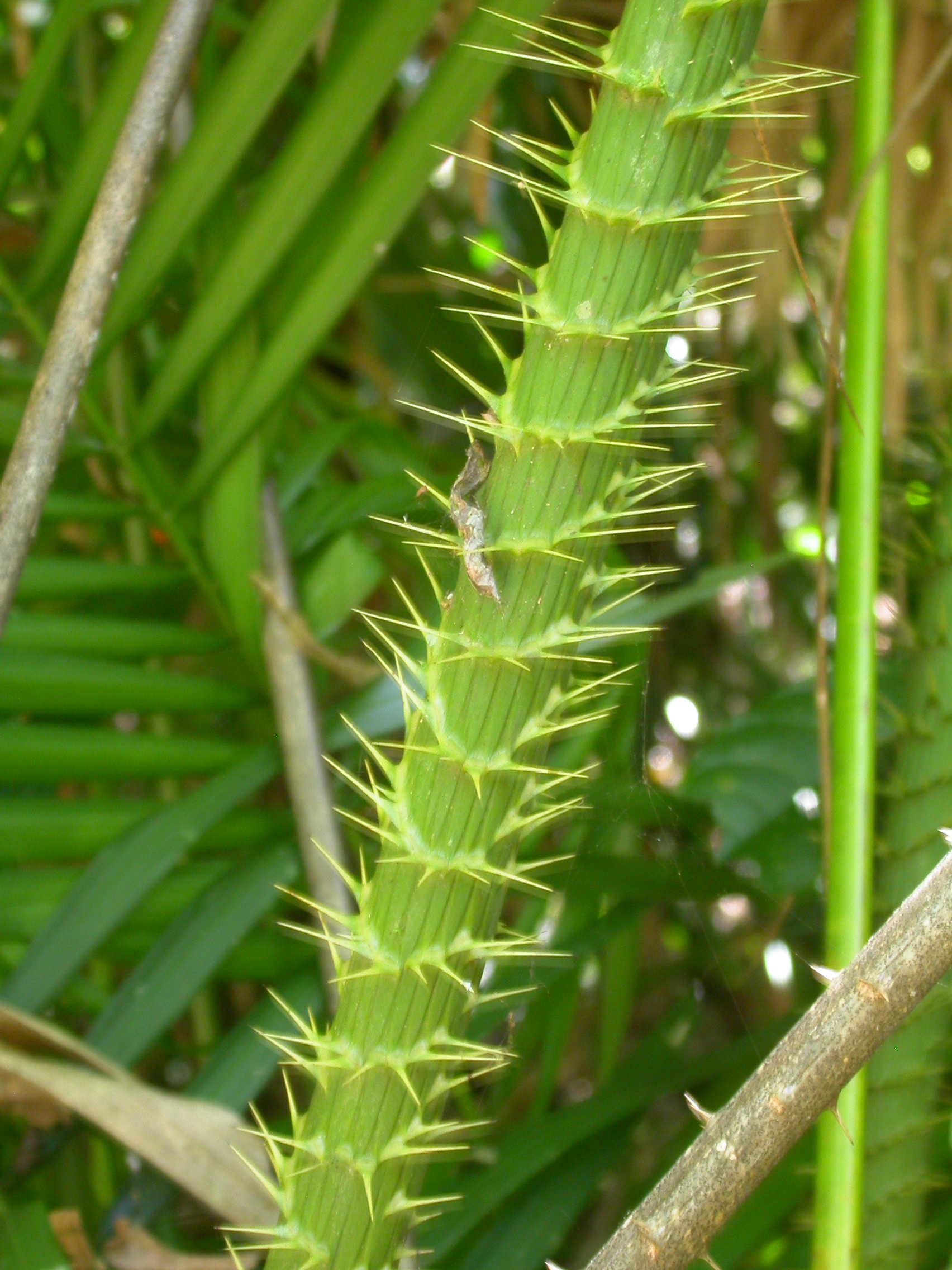
- Stem, showing the large spines

Conservation status
- Least Concern (NCA)

Scientific classification
- Kingdom: Plantae
- Clade: Tracheophytes
- Clade: Angiosperms
- Clade: Monocots
- Clade: Commelinids
- Order: Arecales
- Family: Arecaceae
- Genus: Calamus
- Species: C. moti

Binomial name
- Calamus moti F.M.Bailey
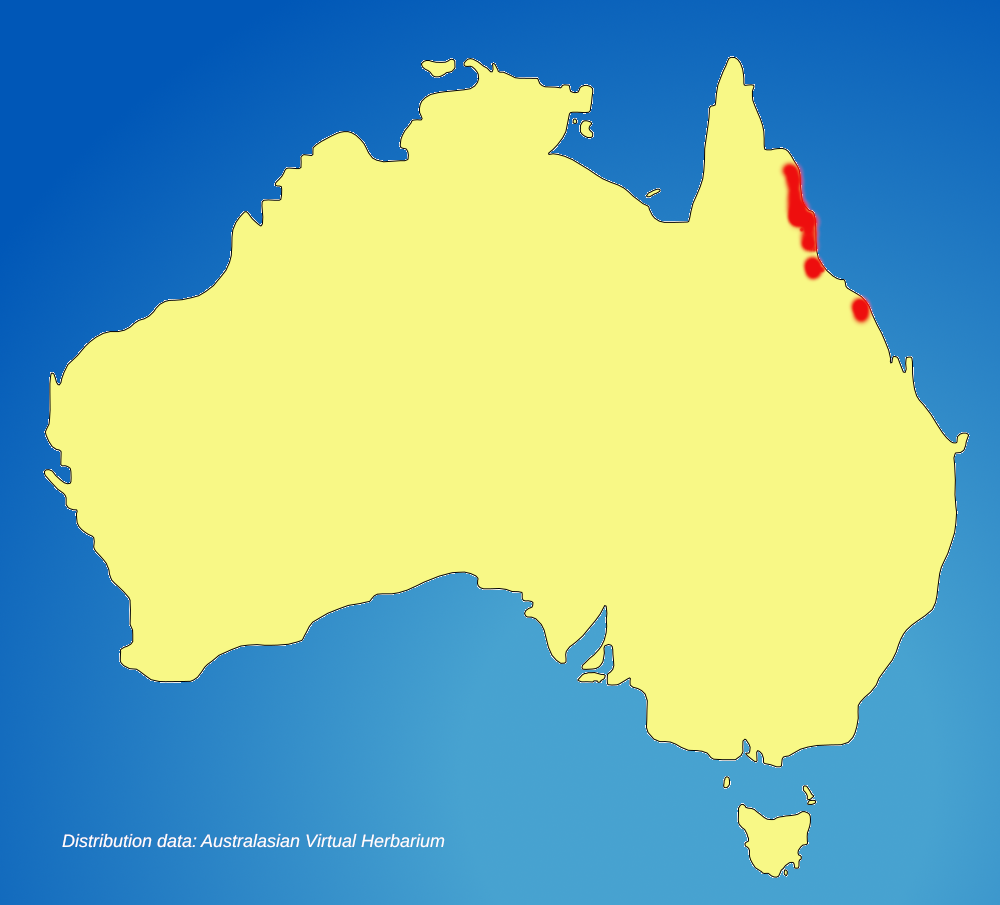

= Calamus moti =

Yellow lawyer cane

Species of flowering plant

Calamus moti is a climbing rainforest plant in the palm family Arecaceae endemic to Queensland, Australia. It has a slim flexible stem which does not support the plant, instead it climbs to the forest canopy with the assistance of long tendrils armed with stout recurved hooks.

== Description ==
This is a clustering, climbing palm with stems up to 5 cm (2.0 in) in diameter and 45 m (148 ft) in length, making it the largest of the eight Calamus species found in Australia. The leaves are up to 3 m (10 ft) long and are pinnate with 35 to 50 leaflets either side of the rachis. The underside of the rachis has three longitudinal rows of stout recurved hooks. The leaflets are linear-lanceolate, up to 60 cm (24 in) long by 3 cm (1.2 in) wide, with very fine barbs on their margins On the upper surface of each leaflet there are two longitudinal rows, one either side of the central vein, of spines measuring up to 10 mm (0.39 in) long.

The leaf sheaths completely surround the stem and are armed with stout yellow-green spines about 20 mm (0.79 in) long arranged in oblique combs. Flagella armed with stout recurved barbs are produced from the leaf sheath and act as grappling hooks providing support for the flexible stem.

On older sections of the stem the fronds and their leaf sheaths fall away, revealing the stem's smooth glossy green surface.

== Taxonomy ==
Calamus moti was first described by Frederick Manson Bailey and published in 1896 in the journal Bulletin of the Department of Agriculture, Brisbane.

=== Etymology ===
The genus name Calamus is derived from the Ancient Greek word κάλαμος (kálamos), meaning 'reed' or 'cane'. The species epithet moti is the name for this plant in the language of the Djabugay people of the Barron River.

== Distribution and habitat ==
C. moti is endemic to Queensland, ranging from near Cooktown southwards to around Mackay. It grows in well developed rainforest, reaching peak development when close to water courses, and it can be found at elevations from close to sea level to about 1,300 m (4,300 ft).

== Ecology and uses ==
The yellow lawyer cane is the host plant for the white-fringed swift Sabera fuliginosa, a butterfly of the family Hesperiidae, and the fruits are eaten by birds.

Indigenous communities of north Queensland ate the fruits and the young shoots, while the cane from the stem was used for many purposes including axe handles, fish and animal traps, shelters and baskets.

== Conservation ==
This species is listed by the Queensland Department of Environment and Science as least concern. As of 8 April 2022, it has not been assessed by the IUCN.

== Gallery ==
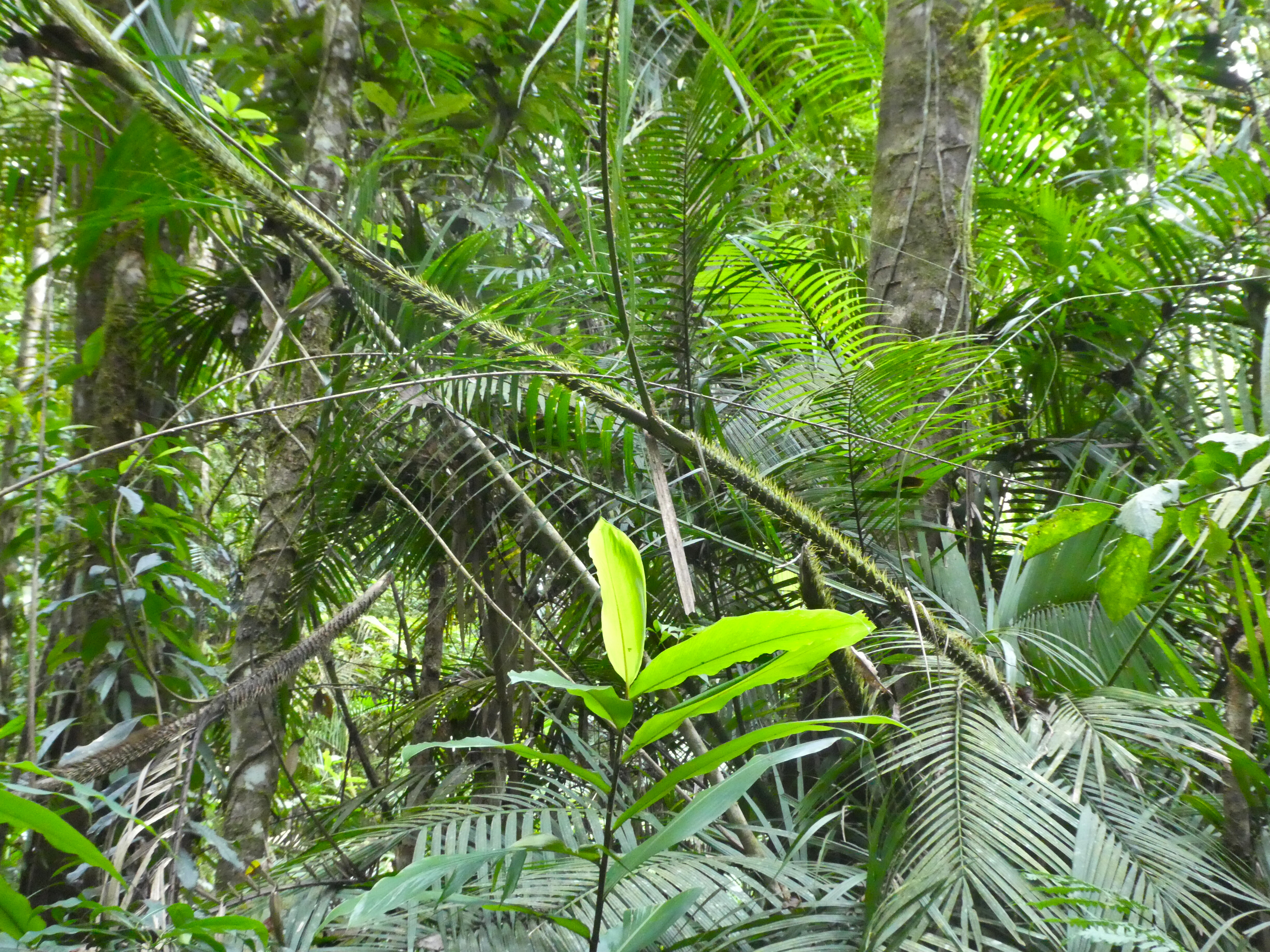
In Wooroonooran National Park

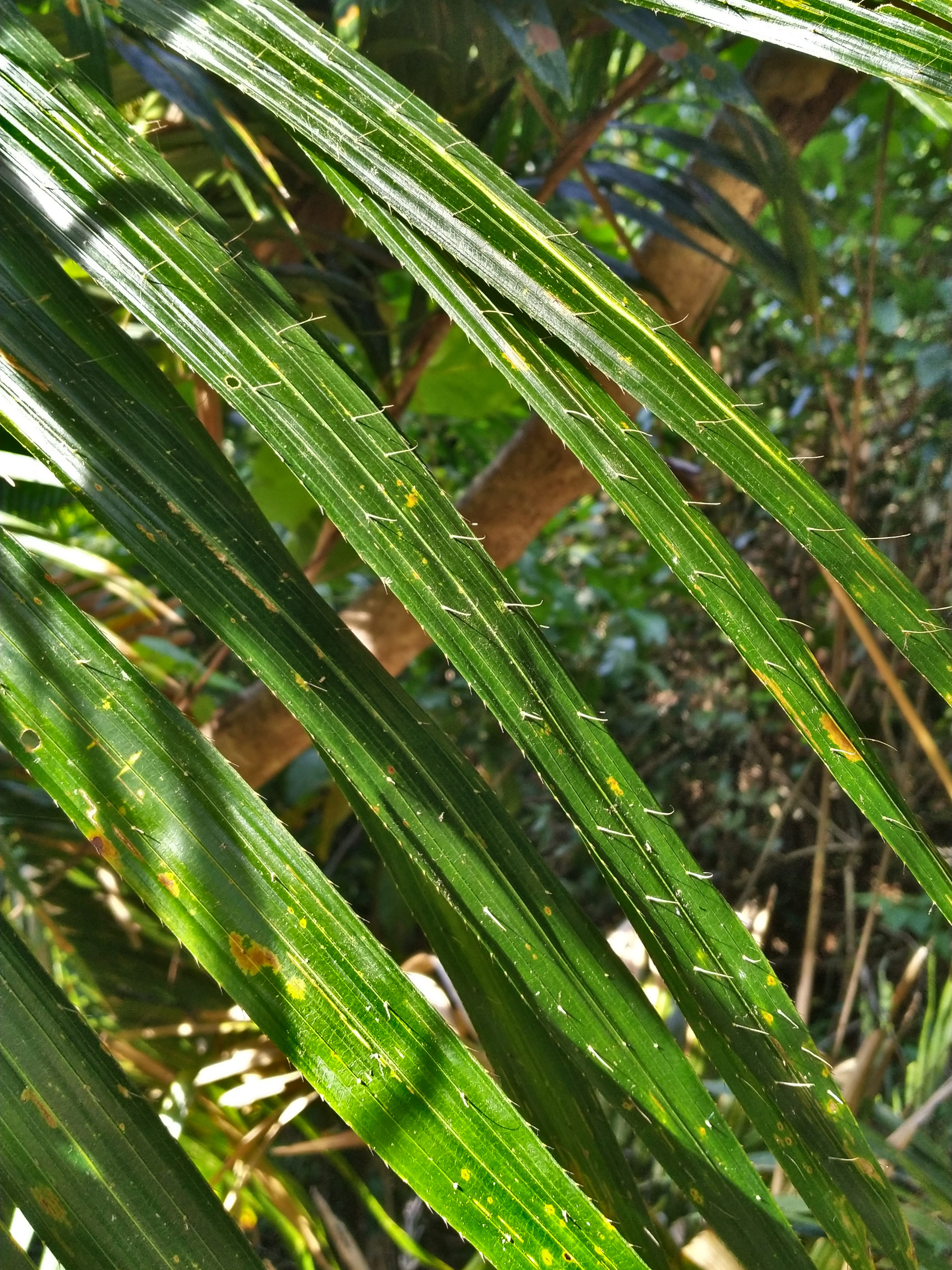
Leaflets showing needle-like spines on upper leaf surface

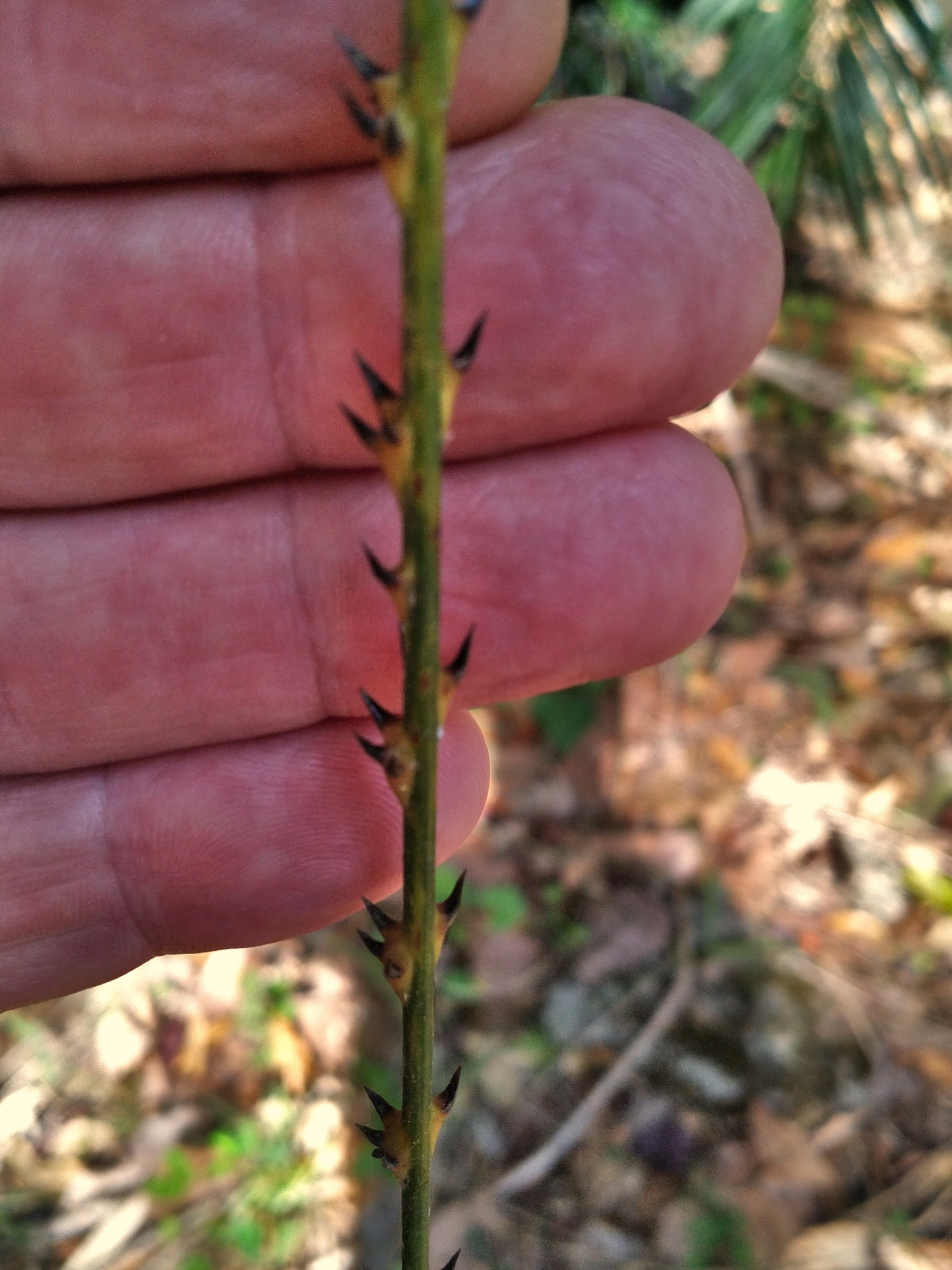
Flagellum showing sharp recurved barbs

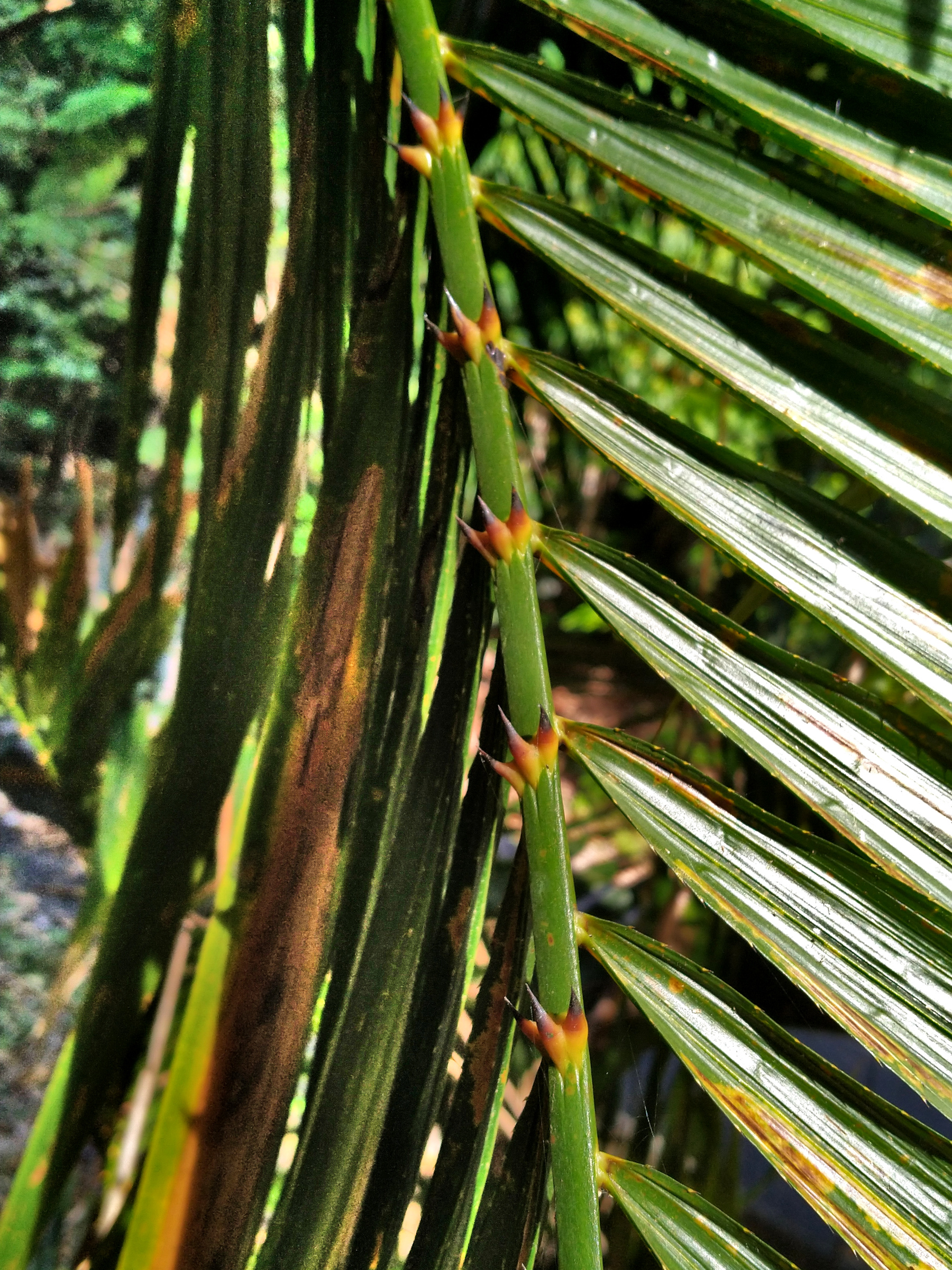
Underside of the rachis with stout barbs

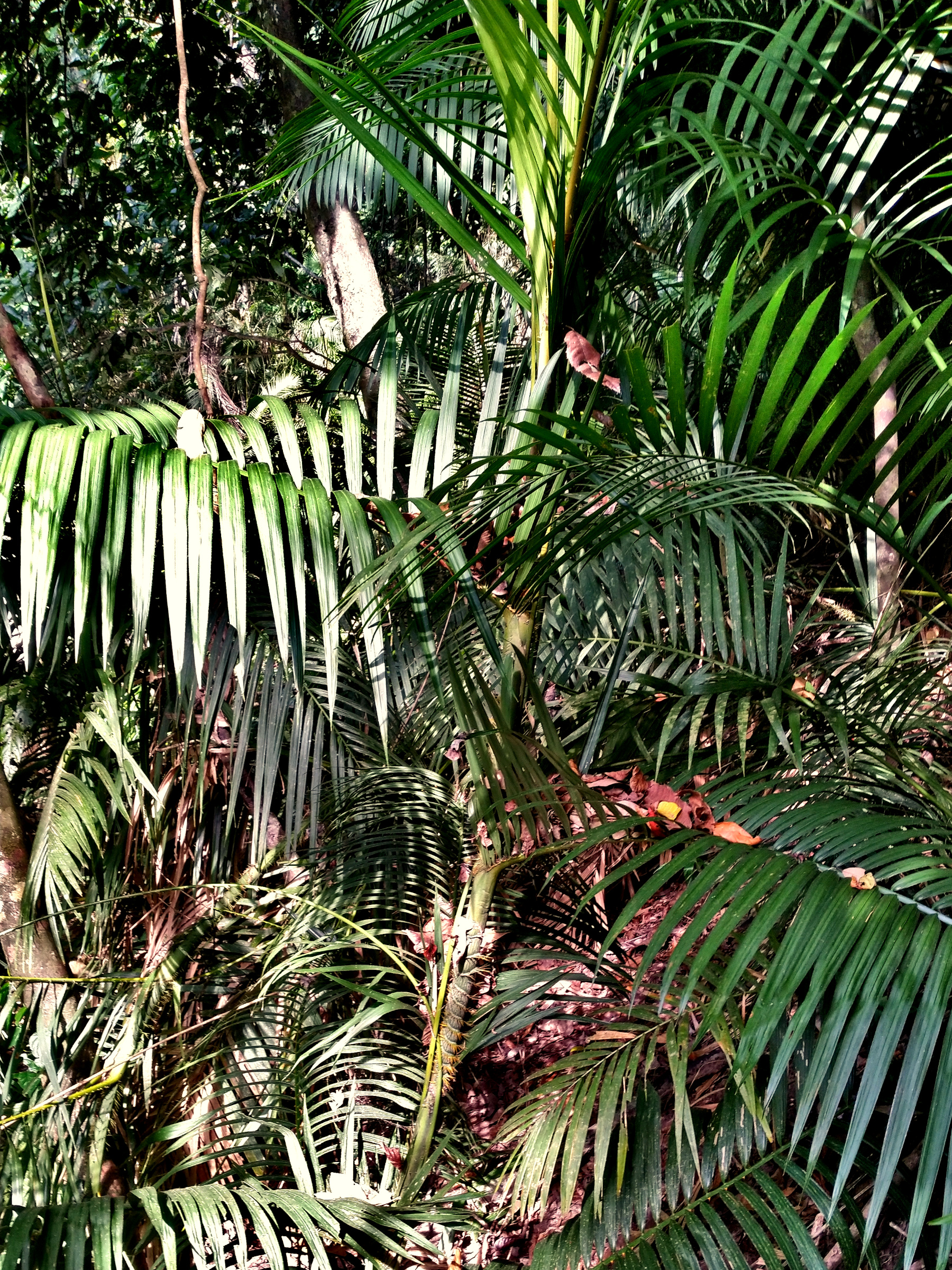
Habit

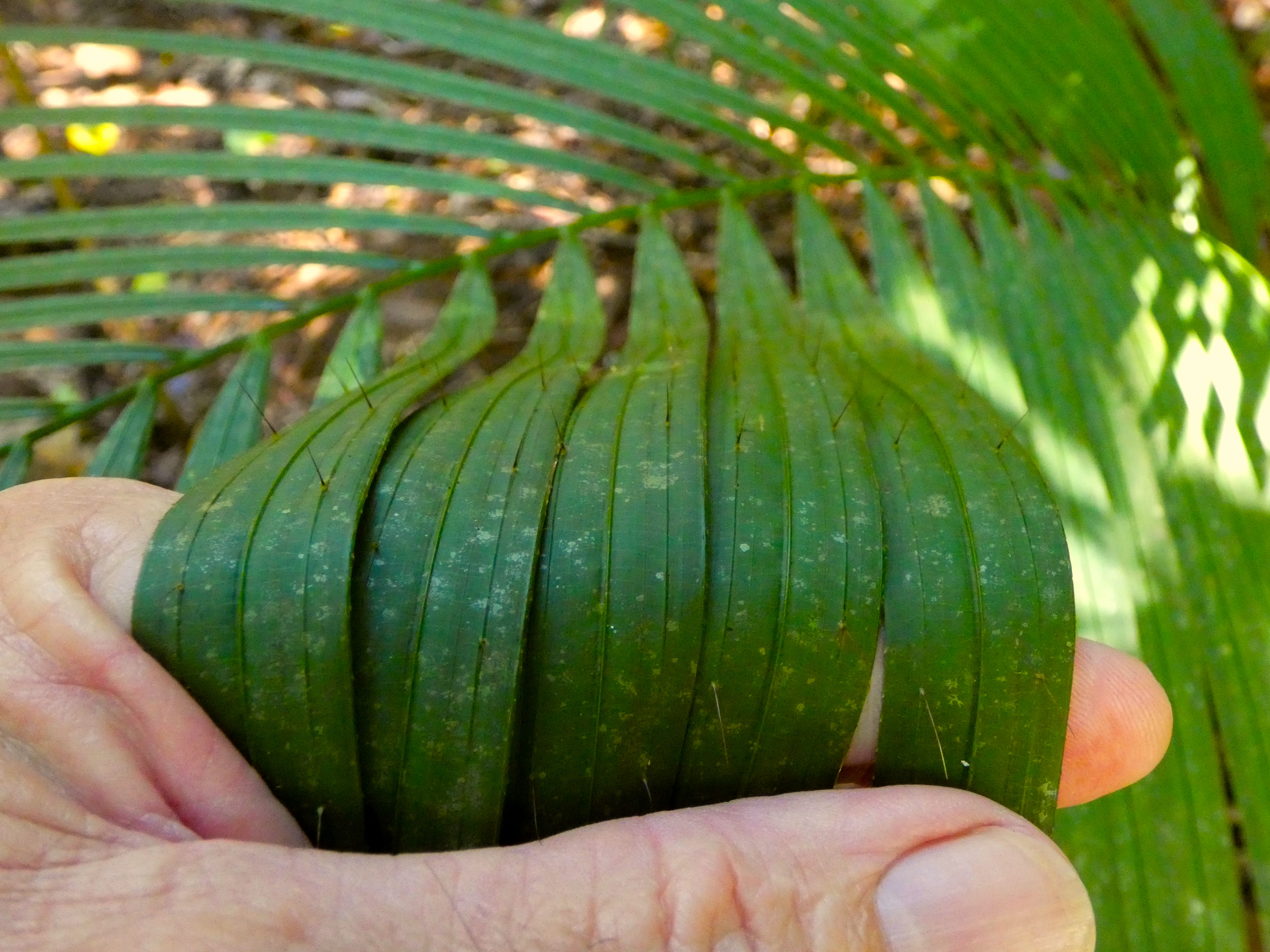
Two row of spines on the top side of the leaflets
