= Cordyline forbesii =

Scientific classification
- Kingdom: Plantae
- Clade: Embryophytes
- Clade: Tracheophytes
- Clade: Spermatophytes
- Clade: Angiosperms
- Clade: Monocots
- Order: Asparagales
- Family: Asparagaceae
- Subfamily: Lomandroideae
- Genus: Cordyline
- Species: C. forbesii

Binomial name
- Cordyline forbesii Rendle

Species of flowering plant

Cordyline forbesii is a species of flowering plant in the family Asparagaceae. It is native to Papua New Guinea, and was described in 1923.

== Taxonomy ==
The species was described by Alfred Barton Rendle in 1923.

== Distribution ==
Cordyline forbesii is native to the wet tropical biome of Papua New Guinea.
