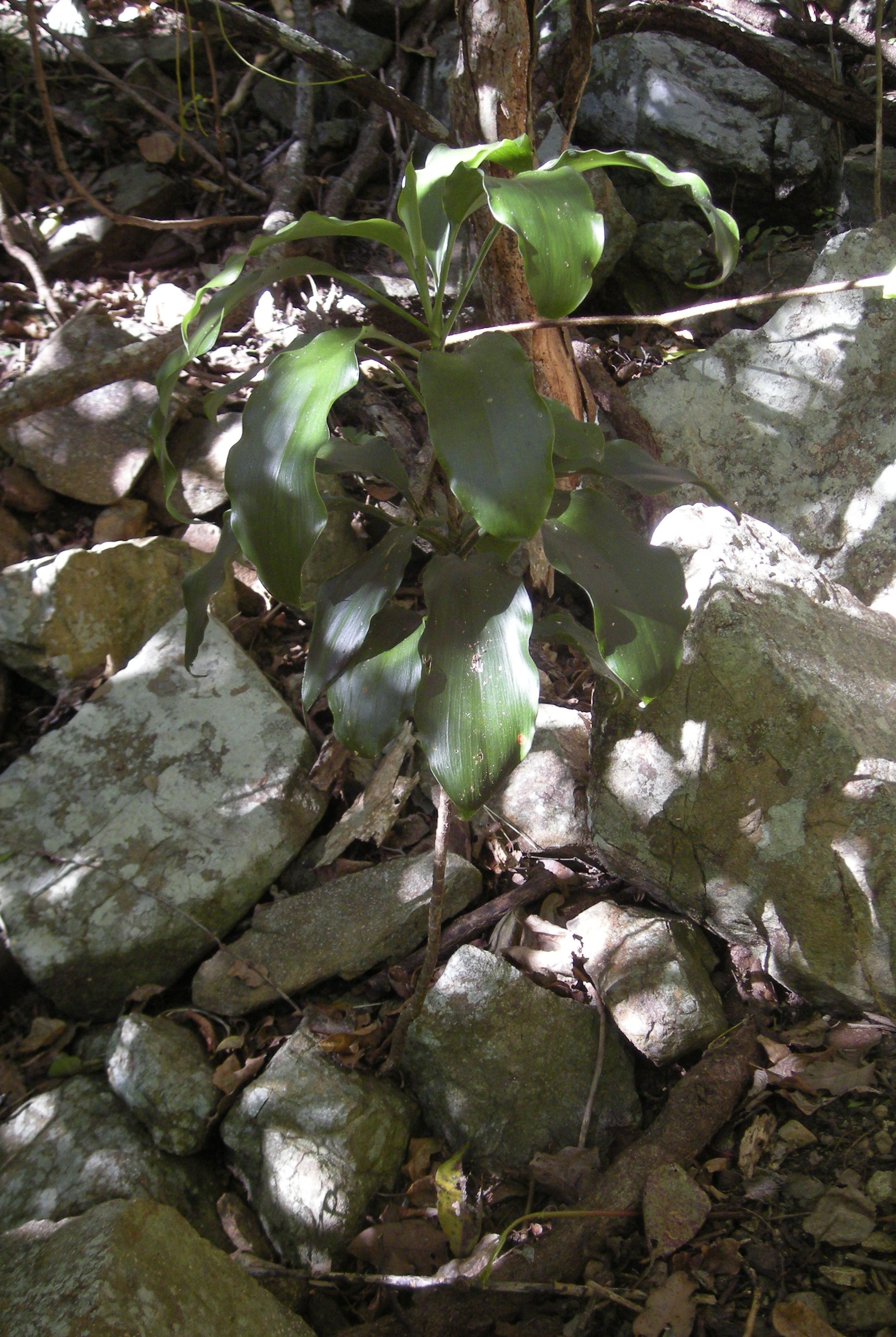
- Cordyline murchisoniae at Mount Archer National Park, Australia

Scientific classification
- Kingdom: Plantae
- Clade: Tracheophytes
- Clade: Angiosperms
- Clade: Monocots
- Order: Asparagales
- Family: Asparagaceae
- Subfamily: Lomandroideae
- Genus: Cordyline
- Species: C. murchisoniae

Binomial name
- Cordyline murchisoniae (F.Muell.)

Synonyms
- Cordyline haageana

= Cordyline murchisoniae =

Dwarf Palm Lily

Species of plant

Cordyline murchisoniae, known as the dwarf palm lily is an evergreen Australian plant. A shrub to 6 metres tall. The range of distribution is coastal Queensland rainforests.

Leaves wavy edged, lanceolate in shape. 15 cm (6 in) long on thin stems. Flowering occurs in spring; being white, reddish or lilac in colour. Fruit is a red berry. Suited to gardens with moist soils in semi shade to full shade. It is not frost tolerant. A bird attracting plant.
