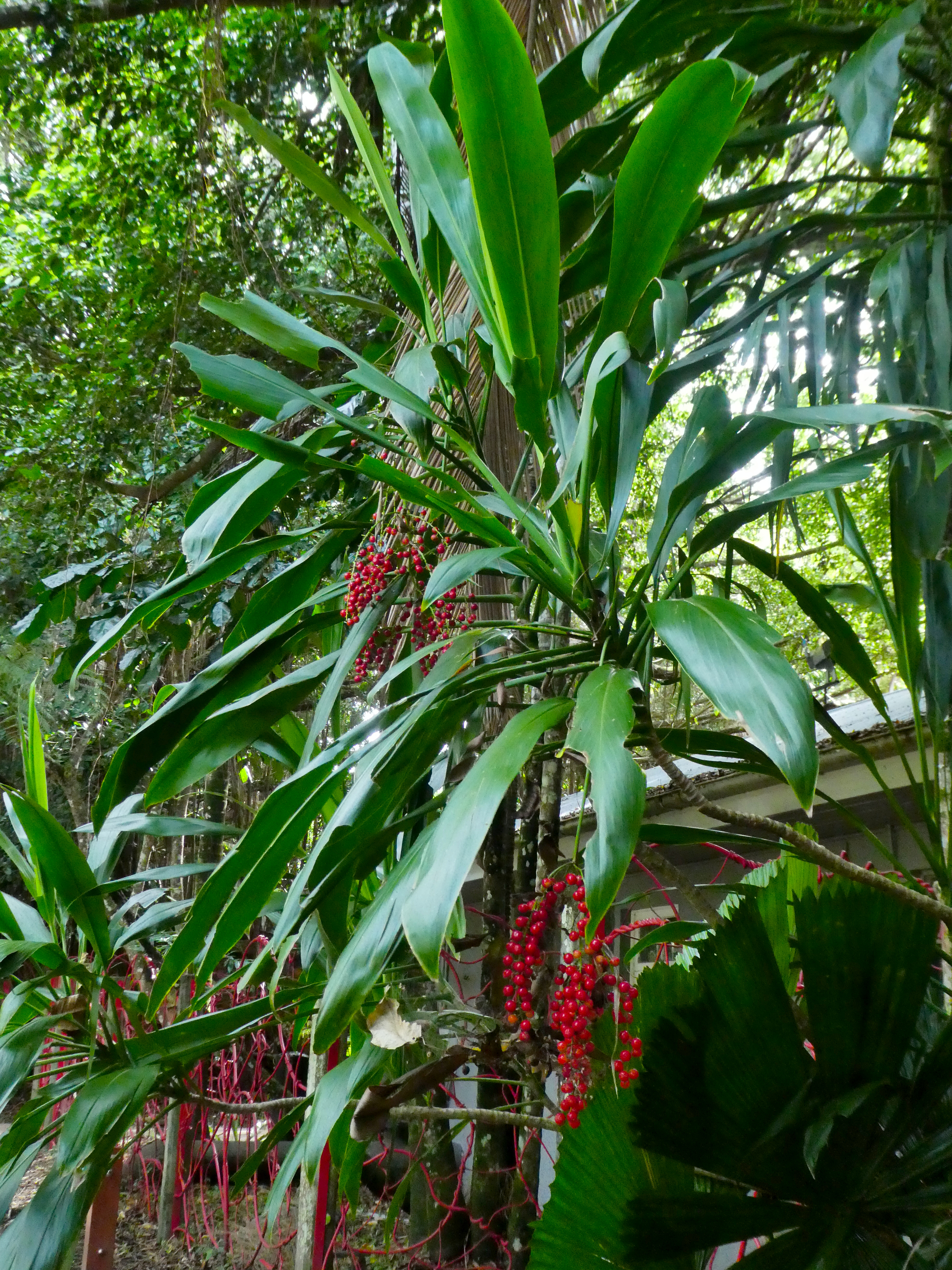
- In fruit, in the Cairns Botanic Gardens precinct, April 2024

Conservation status
- Least Concern (NCA)

Scientific classification
- Kingdom: Plantae
- Clade: Tracheophytes
- Clade: Angiosperms
- Clade: Monocots
- Order: Asparagales
- Family: Asparagaceae
- Subfamily: Lomandroideae
- Genus: Cordyline
- Species: C. manners-suttoniae

Binomial name
- Cordyline manners-suttoniae F.Muell.

Synonyms
- Cordyline terminalis var. manners-suttoniae (F.Muell.) Baker

= Cordyline manners-suttoniae =

Giant Palm Lily

Species of plant in the family Asparagaceae

Cordyline manners-suttoniae, commonly known as the giant palm lily, is an evergreen plant found only in rainforest of northeastern Queensland, Australia.

== Description ==
Cordyline manners-suttoniae is an erect shrub growing to about 4 or 5 m (13 or 16 ft) tall, and may be single stemmed or branched. The large simple leaves are crowded at the ends of the branches. They may reach 65 cm (26 in) long and 12 cm (4.7 in) wide, and are arranged spirally around the stem. Lateral veins run more or less parallel to each other with numerous secondary veins between them. The fleshy petiole may be 30 cm (12 in) long, is "U" shaped in cross-section, and the base widens into a sheath clasping the stem.

The inflorescences are panicles measuring up to 25 cm (9.8 in) long, produced either terminally or from the leaf axils. The bisexual flowers are about 12 mm (0.47 in) long with 3 white or cream petals; they are held on pedicels about 10 mm (0.39 in) long. There are six stamens, the ovary is 3-lobed with 2-16 ovules per locule. The fruit is a bright red glossy berry (in botanical terms) measuring about 8–15 mm (0.31–0.59 in) diameter, containing up to eight small black seeds.

== Taxonomy ==
This species was first described by the German-Australian botanist Ferdinand von Mueller, who published the name and description in his book Fragmenta phytographiæ Australiæ in 1866.

=== Etymology ===
The genus name Cordyline is from the Greek kordyle meaning "club", a reference to the swollen roots of some species. The species epithet manners-suttoniae was given by Mueller in honour of the wife of the Victorian Governor John Henry Manners-Sutton.

== Distribution and habitat ==
The giant palm lily is found in eastern Queensland from about Cooktown southwards to about Rockhampton. It inhabits rainforest in very wet areas, near swamps and areas with poorly drained soils. The altitudinal range is from near sea level to about 700 m (2,300 ft).

== Ecology ==
The fruit of this species are eaten by birds, including the figbird (Sphecotheres vieilloti).

== Gallery ==
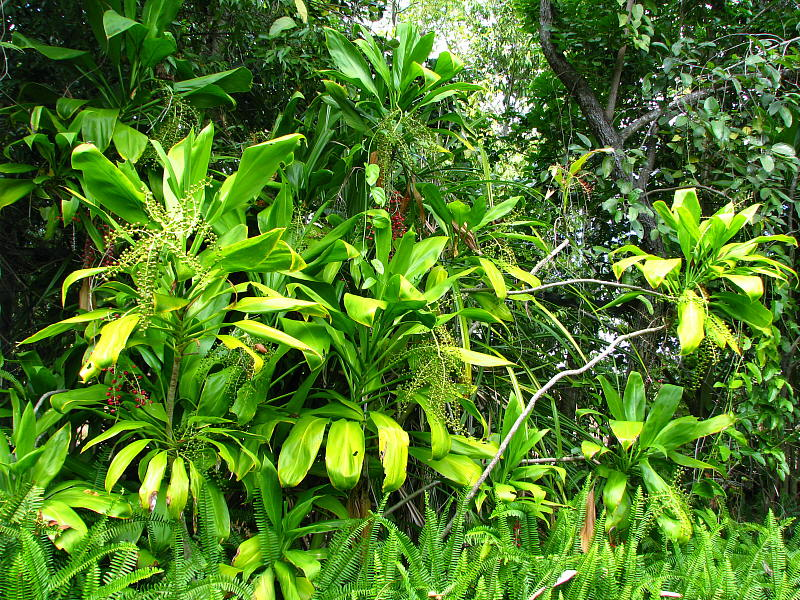
Habit

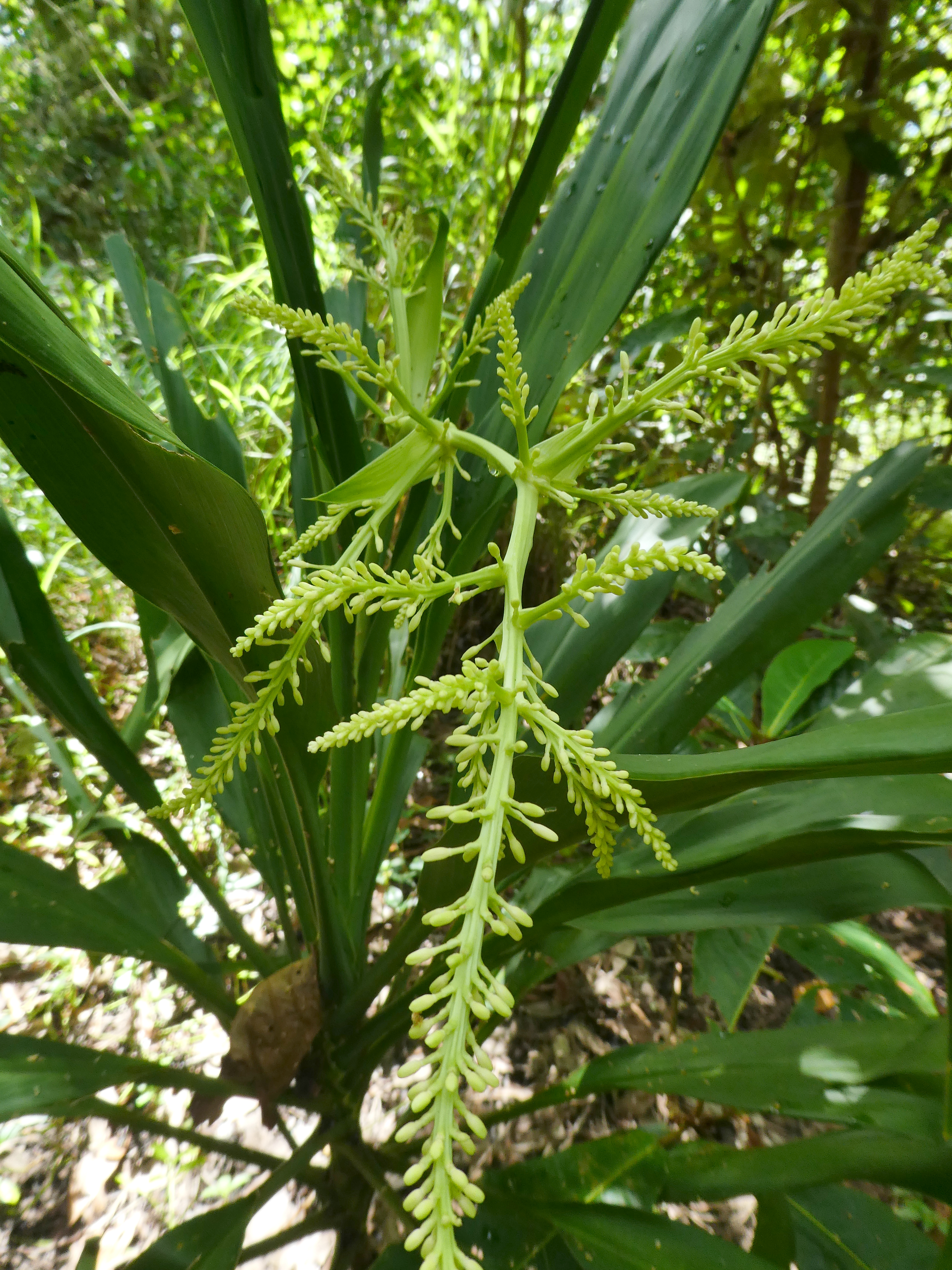
Immature inflorescence

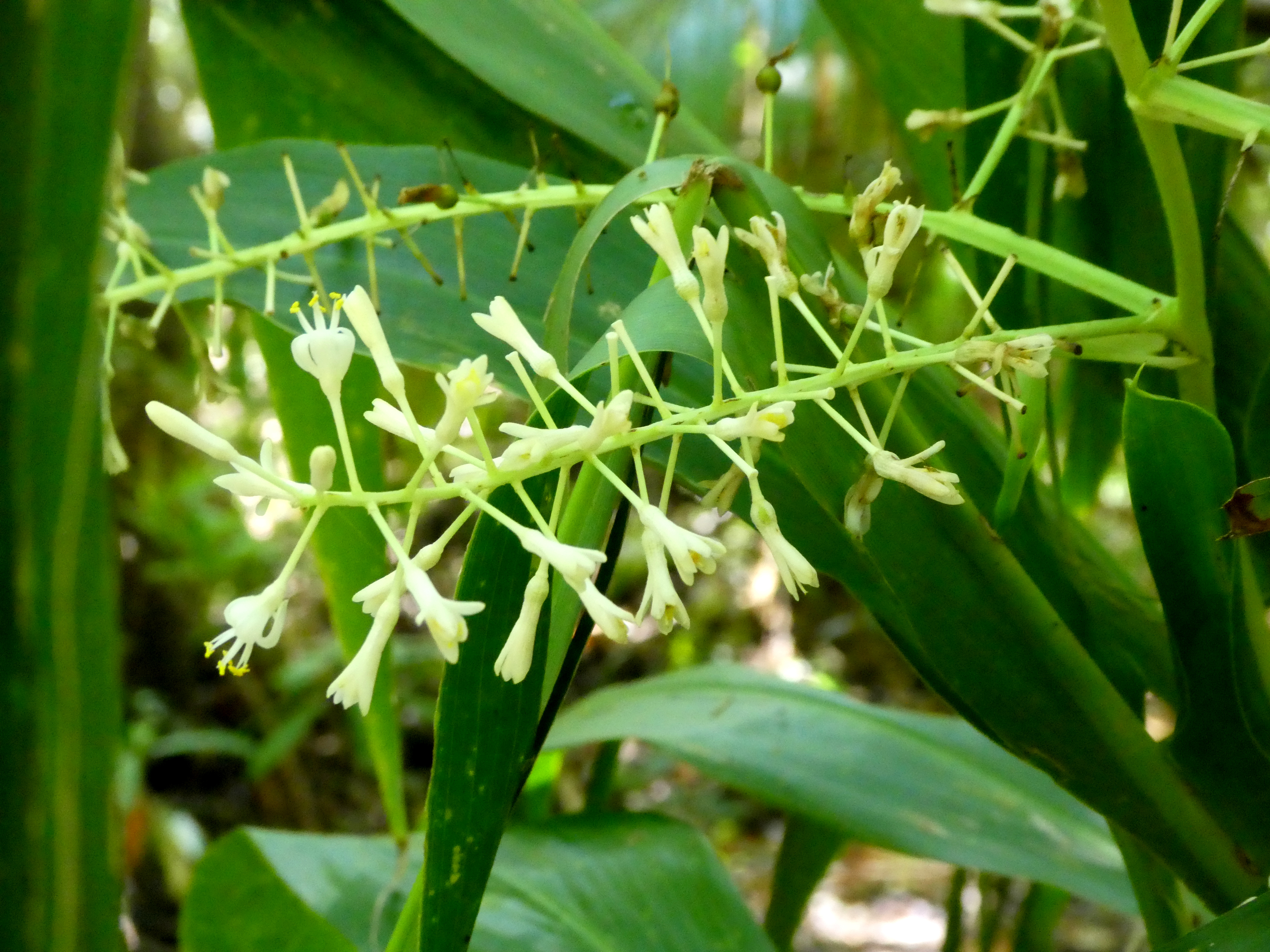
Flowers

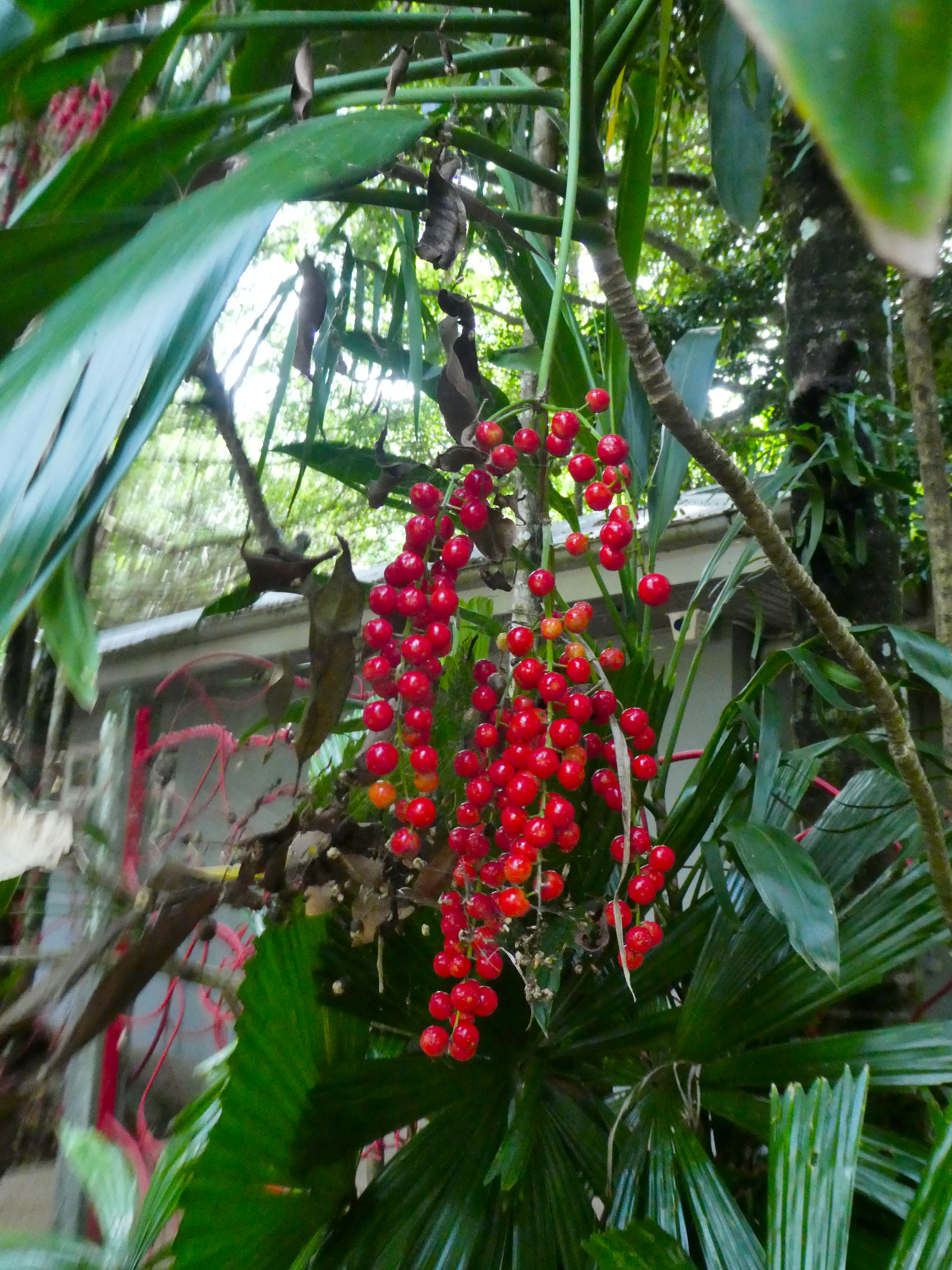
Fruit

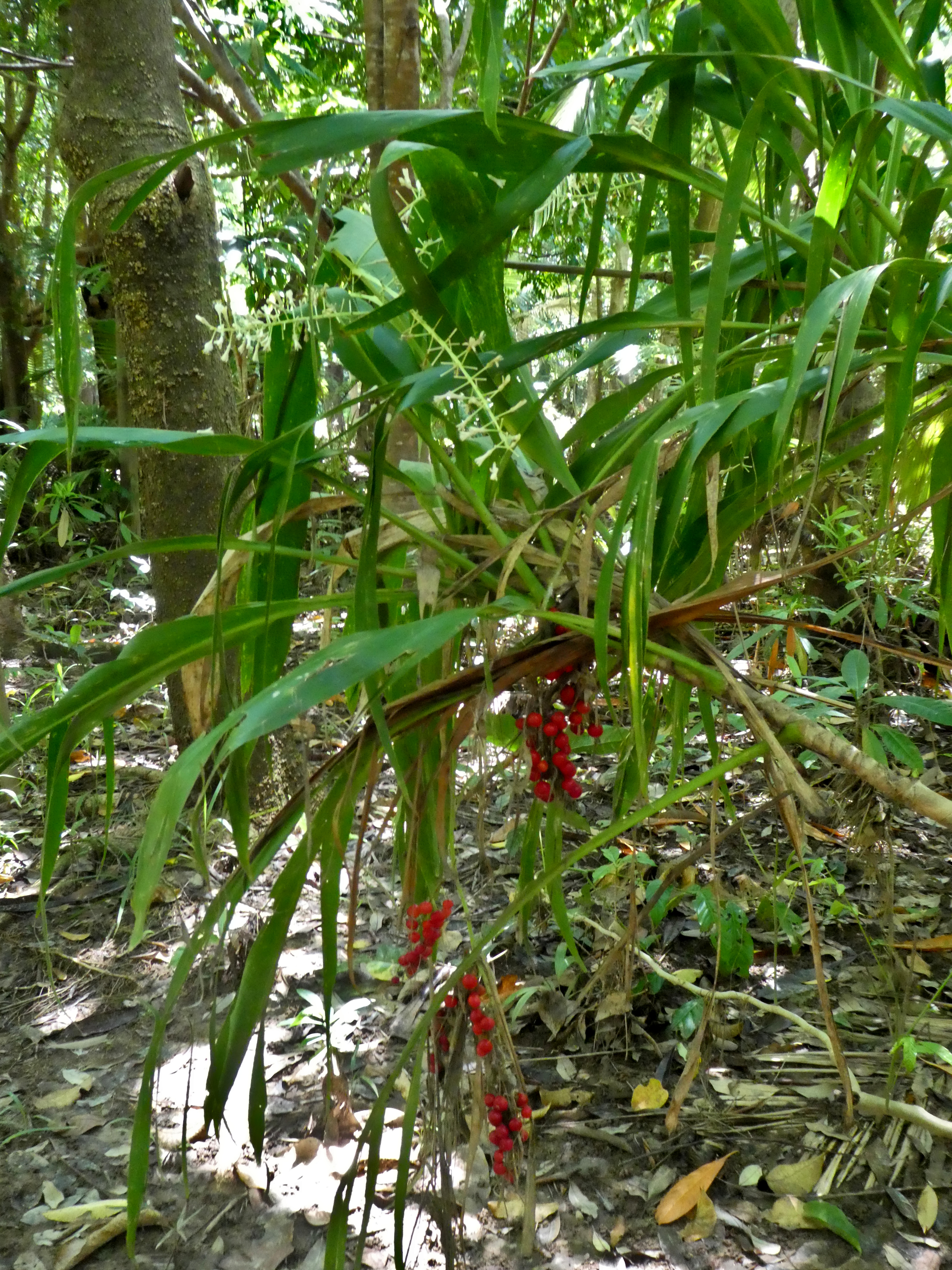
With both flowers and fruit
