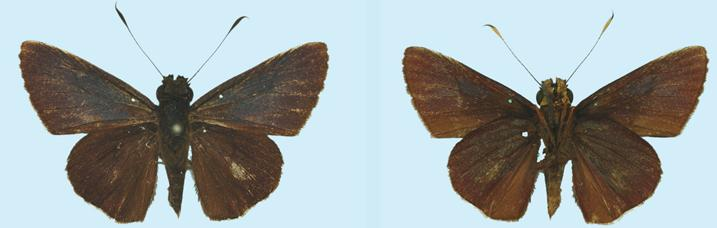
- Sabera metallica upperside (left), underside (right)

Scientific classification
- Kingdom: Animalia
- Phylum: Arthropoda
- Class: Insecta
- Order: Lepidoptera
- Family: Hesperiidae
- Tribe: Taractrocerini
- Genus: Sabera; Swinhoe, 1908

= Sabera =

Genus of butterflies

Sabera is a genus of skippers in the family Hesperiidae.

== Species ==
- Sabera aruana (Plötz, 1886)
- Sabera biaga Evans, 1949
- Sabera caesina (Hewitson, [1866])
- Sabera dobboe (Plötz, 1885)
- Sabera dorena Evans, 1935
- Sabera expansa Evans, 1935
- Sabera fuliginosa (Miskin, 1889)
- Sabera fusca Joicey & Talbot, 1917
- Sabera iloda Parsons, 1989
- Sabera kumpia Evans, 1949
- Sabera madrella Parsons, 1986
- Sabera metallica de Jong, 2008
- Sabera misola Evans, 1949
- Sabera tabla (Swinhoe, 1905)
