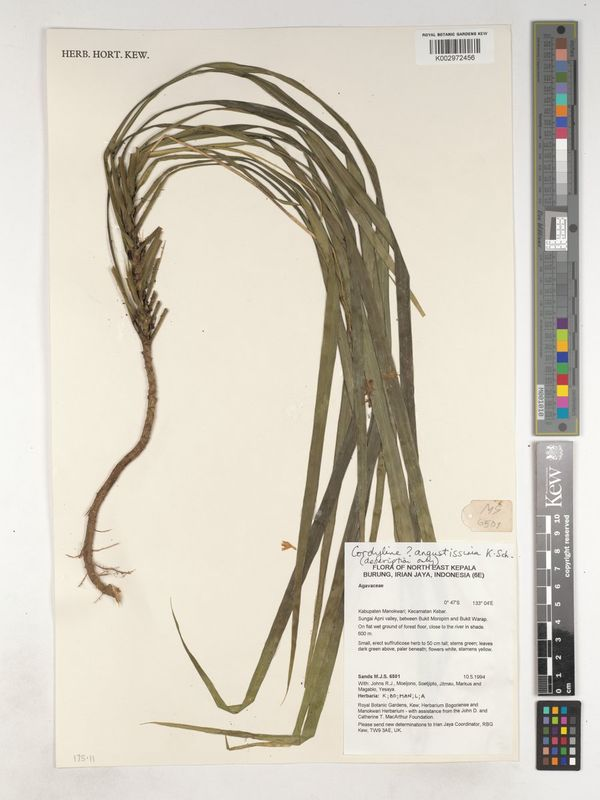

Scientific classification
- Kingdom: Plantae
- Clade: Embryophytes
- Clade: Tracheophytes
- Clade: Spermatophytes
- Clade: Angiosperms
- Clade: Monocots
- Order: Asparagales
- Family: Asparagaceae
- Subfamily: Lomandroideae
- Genus: Cordyline
- Species: C. angustissima

Binomial name
- Cordyline angustissima K.Schum.

= Cordyline angustissima =

Species of flowering plant

Cordyline angustissima is a species of flowering plant in the family Asparagaceae. The species is native to New Guinea, and was described in 1905.

== Taxonomy ==
The species was described by Karl Moritz Schumann in 1905.

== Distribution ==
Cordyline angustissima is native to the wet tropical biome of New Guinea.
