= Cordyline =

- Cordyline australis

Scientific classification
- Kingdom: Plantae
- Clade: Tracheophytes
- Clade: Angiosperms
- Clade: Monocots
- Order: Asparagales
- Family: Asparagaceae
- Subfamily: Lomandroideae
- Genus: Cordyline; Comm. ex R.Br.

Species
- See text

Synonyms
- Calodracon Planch.; Charlwoodia Sweet; Cohnia Kunth; Dracaenopsis Planch.; Euphyleia Raf.; Ezehlsia Lour. ex B.A.Gomes; Taetsia Medik.; Terminalis Rumph. ex Kuntze

Genus of flowering plants

Cordyline is a genus of about 24 species of woody monocotyledonous flowering plants in family Asparagaceae, subfamily Lomandroideae. The subfamily has previously been treated as a separate family Laxmanniaceae, or Lomandraceae. Other authors have placed the genus in the Agavaceae (now Agavoideae). Cordyline is native to the western Pacific Ocean region, from New Zealand, eastern Australia, southeastern Asia and Polynesia, with one species found in southeastern South America.

The name Cordyline comes from the Greek word kordyle, meaning "club," a reference to the enlarged underground stems or rhizomes.

== Species ==
As of July 2026, Plants of the World Online accepts 24 species.

- Cordyline angustissima K.Schum. – New Guinea
- Cordyline australis (G.Forst.) Endl. (Cabbage Tree) – New Zealand
- Cordyline banksii Hook.f. (syn. C. diffusa Colenso.) – New Zealand
- Cordyline bergenii S.S.Ying
- Cordyline cannifolia R.Br. – Australia: N.E. Northern Territory, N.E. Queensland
- Cordyline congesta (Sweet) Steud. (syn. C. dracaenoides Kunth) – Australia: S.E. Queensland to N.E. New South Wales
- Cordyline forbesii Rendle – Papua New Guinea
- Cordyline fruticosa (L.) A.Chev. (syn. C. casanovae Linden ex André) – Papuasia to W. Pacific
- Cordyline × gibbingsiae Carse (C. banksii × C. pumilio) – New Zealand
- Cordyline indivisa (G.Forst.) Endl. (mountain cabbage tree) – New Zealand (syn. Cordyline hectori, Cordyline hookeri)
- Cordyline lateralis Lauterb. – New Guinea
- Cordyline ledermannii K.Krause – New Guinea
- Cordyline manners-suttoniae F.Muell. – Australia: N.E. Queensland
- Cordyline × matthewsii Carse (C. australis × C. pumilio) – New Zealand
- Cordyline mauritiana (Lam.) J.F.Macbr. – Mascarenes
- Cordyline minutiflora Ridl. – New Guinea
- Cordyline murchisoniae F.Muell. (syn. C. haageana K.Koch) – Australia: E. Queensland
- Cordyline neocaledonica (Baker) B.D.Jacks. – New Caledonia
- Cordyline obtecta (Graham) Baker – Norfolk Island, N. New Zealand North Island
- Cordyline petiolaris (Domin) Pedley – Australia: S.E. Queensland to N.E. New South Wales
- Cordyline pumilio Hook.f. – New Zealand North Island
- Cordyline racemosa Ridl. – New Guinea
- Cordyline rubra Otto & A.Dietr. – Australia: S.E. Queensland to N.E. New South Wales
- Cordyline schlechteri Lauterb. – New Guinea
- Cordyline sellowiana Kunth – Bolivia to Brazil and N. Argentina
- Cordyline stricta (Sims) Endl. – Australia: S.E. Queensland to N.E. New South Wales

=== Formerly placed here ===
- Dracaena aletriformis (Haw.) Bos (as C. rumphii Hook.)
- Dracaena elliptica Thunb. & Dalm. (as C. maculata (Roxb.) Planch. and C. sieboldii Planch.)
- Dracaena fragrans (L.) Ker Gawl. (as C. fragrans (L.) Planch.)

== Cultivation and uses ==
Members of the group are often grown as ornamental plants - notably C. australis and C. fruticosa. Many species have been used as a foodstuff and medicine, for additional details on these and other uses see the article on C. australis. The rhizome was roasted in an hāngī (earth oven) by Māori to extract sugar.

In the highlands of Papua New Guinea. leaves of Cordyline and other plants are tied to sticks to mark taboo areas where pandanus language must be spoken during karuka harvest.
