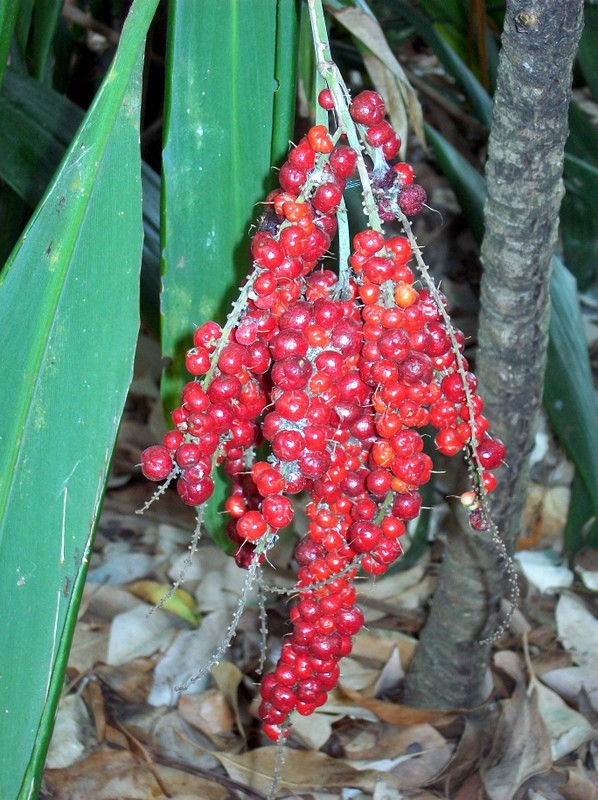
- Cordyline petiolaris

Scientific classification
- Kingdom: Plantae
- Clade: Tracheophytes
- Clade: Angiosperms
- Clade: Monocots
- Order: Asparagales
- Family: Asparagaceae
- Subfamily: Lomandroideae
- Genus: Cordyline
- Species: C. petiolaris

Binomial name
- Cordyline petiolaris (Domin) Pedley

Synonyms
- Cordyline terminalis var. petiolaris Domin

= Cordyline petiolaris =

Broad-leaved palm lily

Species of flowering plant

Cordyline petiolaris, known as the broad leaved palm lily is an evergreen Australian plant. A shrub to around 5 metres tall. Found in warm rainforest and moist eucalyptus forest. The range of natural distribution is from the Nambucca River to near Gladstone, Queensland.

Leaves 30 to 80 cm long, and 4 to 12 cm wide, elliptic in shape. Leaves on long unrolled leaf stalks. The species name petiolaris refers to these long stems.

Flowering occurs from late winter to spring, being white or lilac in colour. Fruit is a red berry, 7 to 10 mm in diameter. The fruit can persist on the plant for many months. This species propagates easily from seeds or stem cuttings.

Not as widely seen in cultivation as Cordyline australis, however it is also well suited to gardens with moist soils in semi shade. It is not frost tolerant. Also suited as an indoor pot plant.
