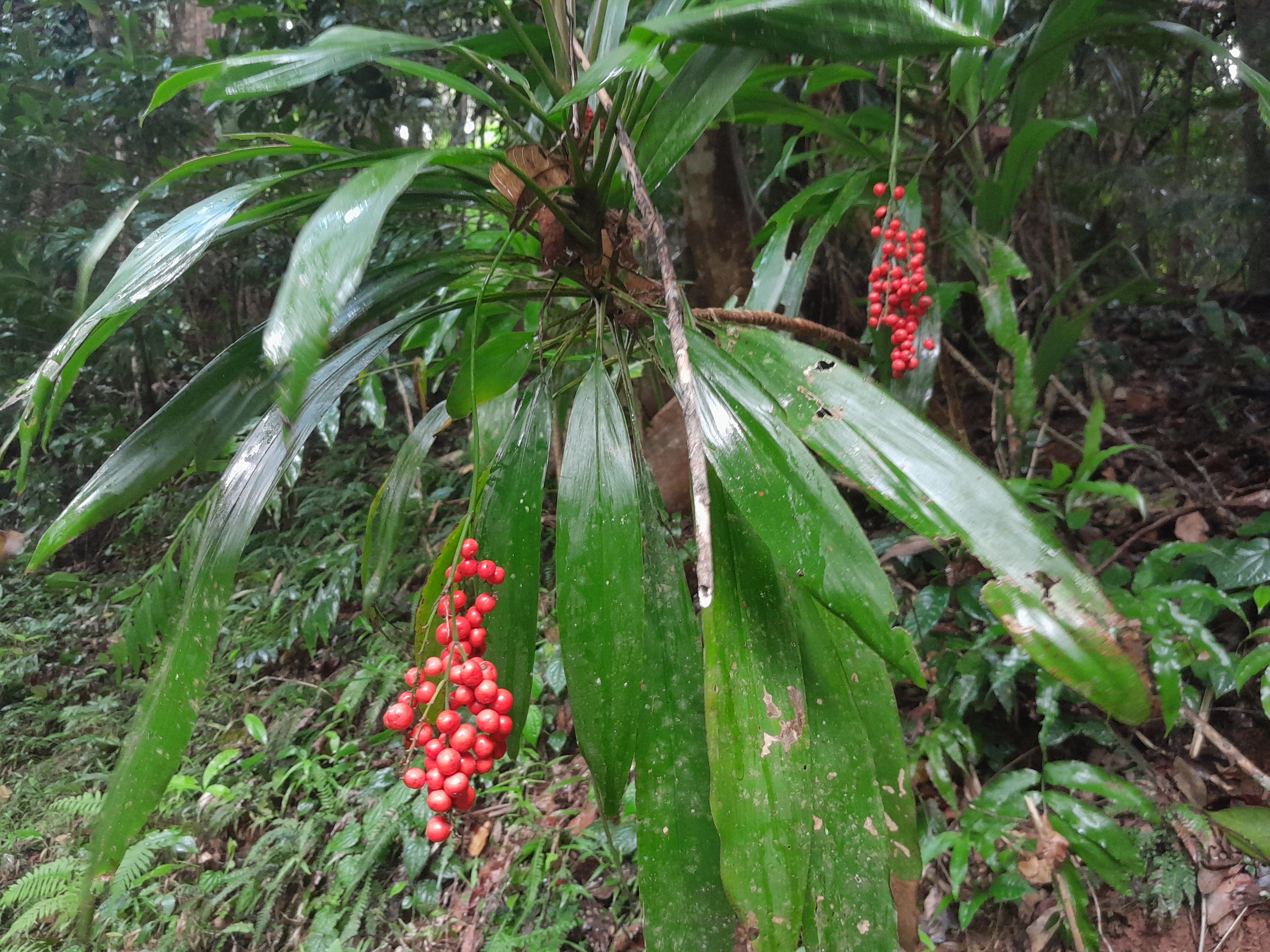
- In rainforest near Cairns, Queensland

Conservation status
- Special Least Concern (NCA)

Scientific classification
- Kingdom: Plantae
- Clade: Tracheophytes
- Clade: Angiosperms
- Clade: Monocots
- Order: Asparagales
- Family: Asparagaceae
- Subfamily: Lomandroideae
- Genus: Cordyline
- Species: C. cannifolia

Binomial name
- Cordyline cannifolia R.Br.

Synonyms
- Cordyline terminalis var. cannifolia (R.Br.) Baker; Dracaena cannifolia (R.Br.) Galeotti; Sansevieria cannifolia (R.Br.) Spreng.

= Cordyline cannifolia =

Species of flowering plant

Cordyline cannifolia, one of several plants known as palm lily, is a species of evergreen shrub in the family Asparagaceae. It is known to occur in the Australian states of Queensland and the Northern Territory and may possibly occur in New Guinea. It was first described by botanist Robert Brown in 1810.

== Description ==
Cordyline cannifolia is an open, erect, often single-stemmed shrub which generally grows to a height of about 3 m (9.8 ft), although it may reach 5 m (16 ft). The stem and branches carry numerous scars where leaves were attached. Large simple leaves are produced towards the end of the stem and branches, and are arranged alternately. They are mid green above, and the underside is matt blue-green (glaucous) with the numerous secondary veins quite apparent. The leaves measure between about 20 and 50 cm (8 and 20 in) long and about 5 to 12 cm (2.0 to 4.7 in) wide, and are held on a petiole that may be anywhere between 5 and 20 cm (2 and 8 in) long. The petiole is "grooved" above, often so much so that it has a U-shaped cross section, and the base clasps the stem, overlapping the petiole base of the younger leaf above it.

The inflorescence is a panicle up to 25 cm (10 in) long, with numerous flowers attached to it by short stalks about 2 mm (0.08 in) long. The flowers have five petals about 7 mm (0.28 in) long, five stamens and one style. The red fruit are, in botanical terms, a berry about 1 cm (0.4 in) diameter with up to six small black seeds inside.

== Taxonomy ==
This species was first described in 1810 by Scottish botanist Robert Brown, who published the name in his book Prodromus floræ Novæ Hollandiæ et Insulæ Van-Diemen.

Three other names have been published for this species – in 1825, German botanist Kurt Polycarp Joachim Sprengel published the name Sanseviera cannifolia, Belgian botanist Henri Guillaume Galeotti published the name Dracaena cannifolia in 1857, and English botanist John Gilbert Baker published the combination Cordyline terminalis var. cannifolia in 1875. None of these are now accepted and all are considered synonyms of C. cannifolia.

== Distribution and habitat ==
Collections of this species have been made along almost the entire east coast of Queensland, from the top of Cape York Peninsula south to K'gari (Fraser Island), but the bulk of the collections are in or near the Wet Tropics bioregion around Cairns. It also occurs in the northeastern part of the Northern Territory, and there is a single record of collection from Papua New Guinea on GBIF. The latter is considered to be doubtful.

The plant inhabits rainforest and wet sclerophyll forest, at altitudes from sea level to about 1,200 m (3,900 ft).

== Conservation ==
This species is listed as Special Least Concern under the Queensland Government's Nature Conservation Act. The classification of 'special least concern' is defined in Clause 88D (p. 115) of the Act. As of April 2025, it has not been assessed by the International Union for Conservation of Nature (IUCN).

== Ecology ==
The fruit are eaten by cassowaries and native rodents.

== Gallery ==
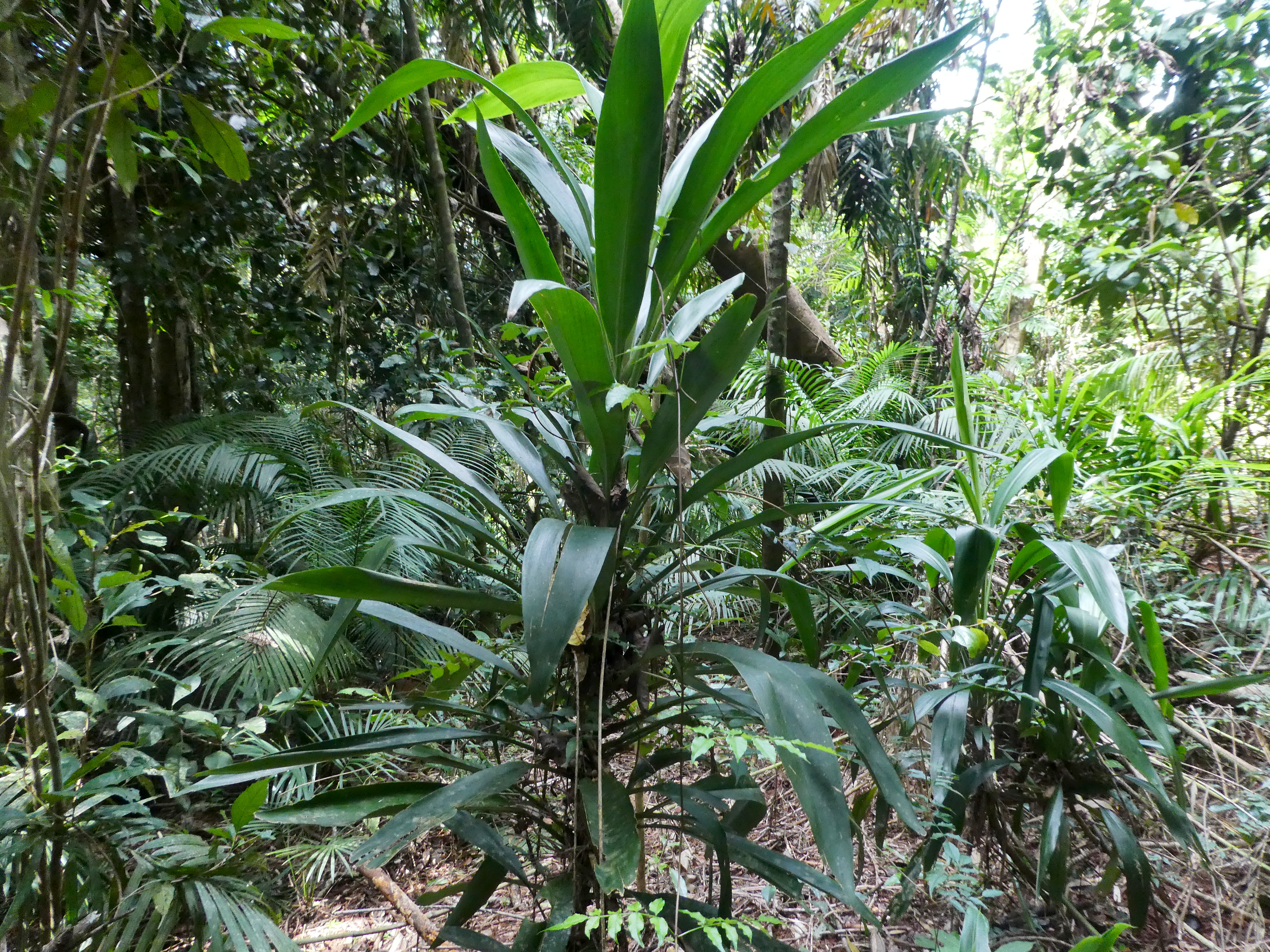
Habit, with single stem

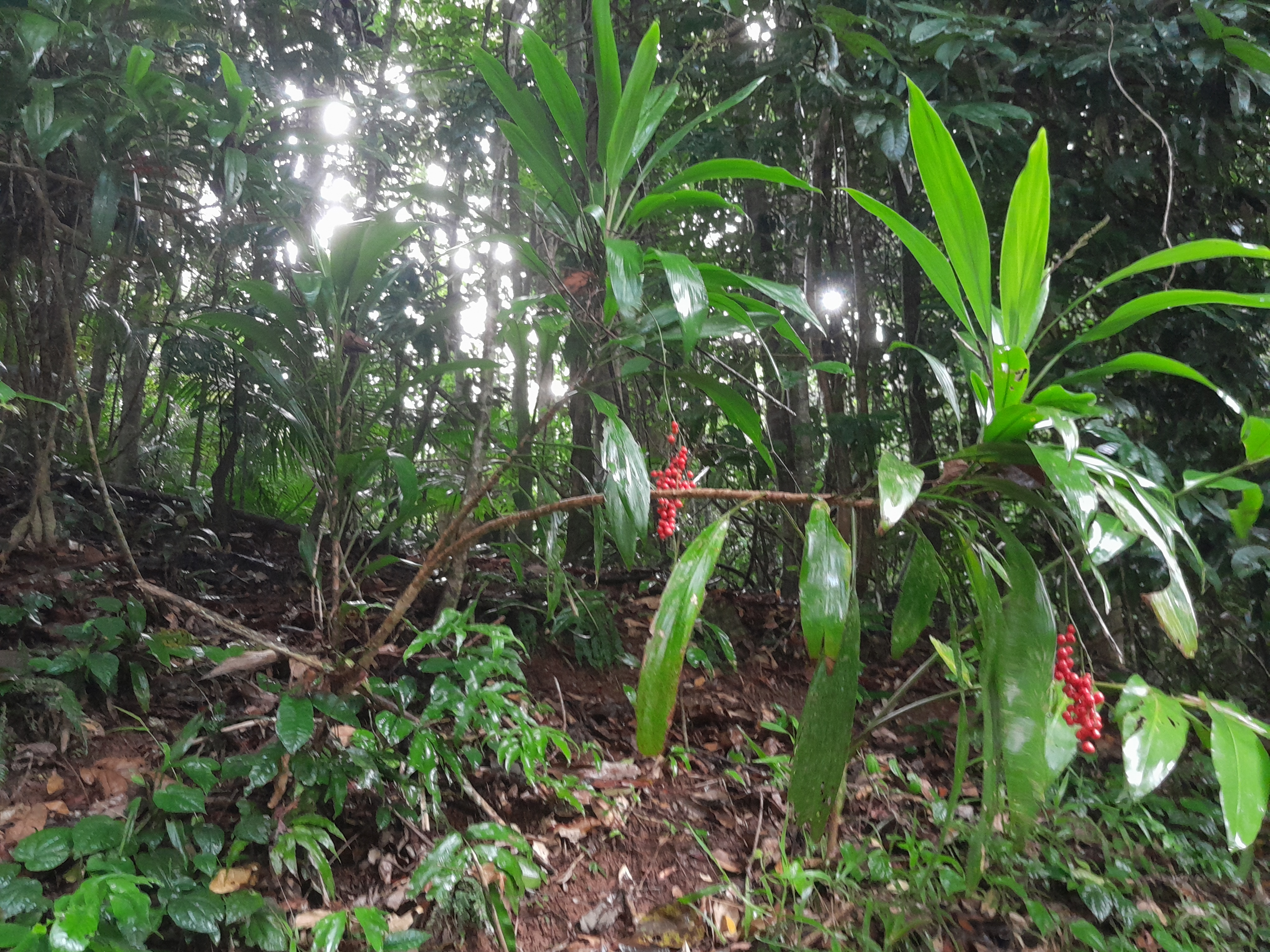
Habit, branched

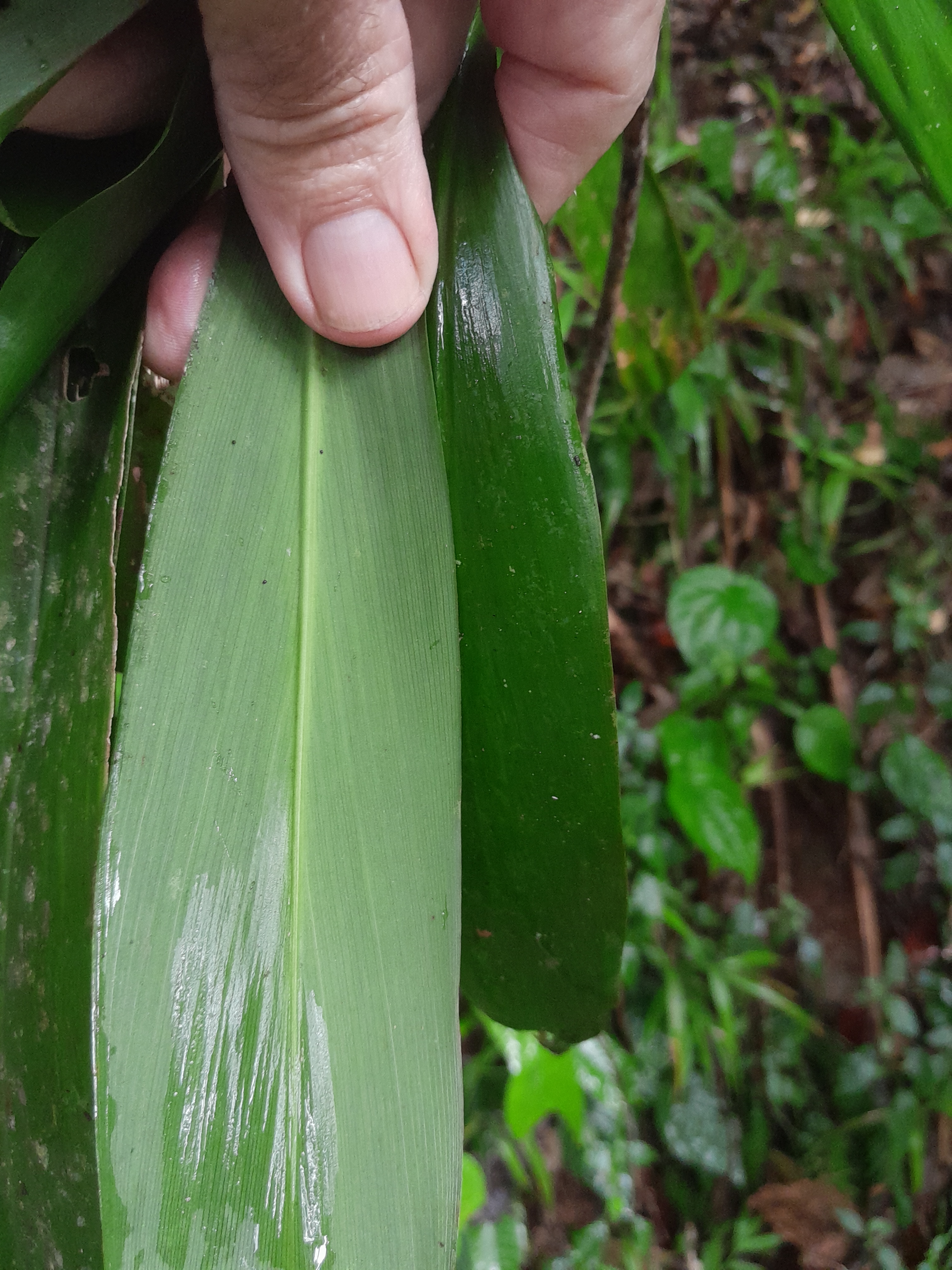
Upper and lower sides of the leaf

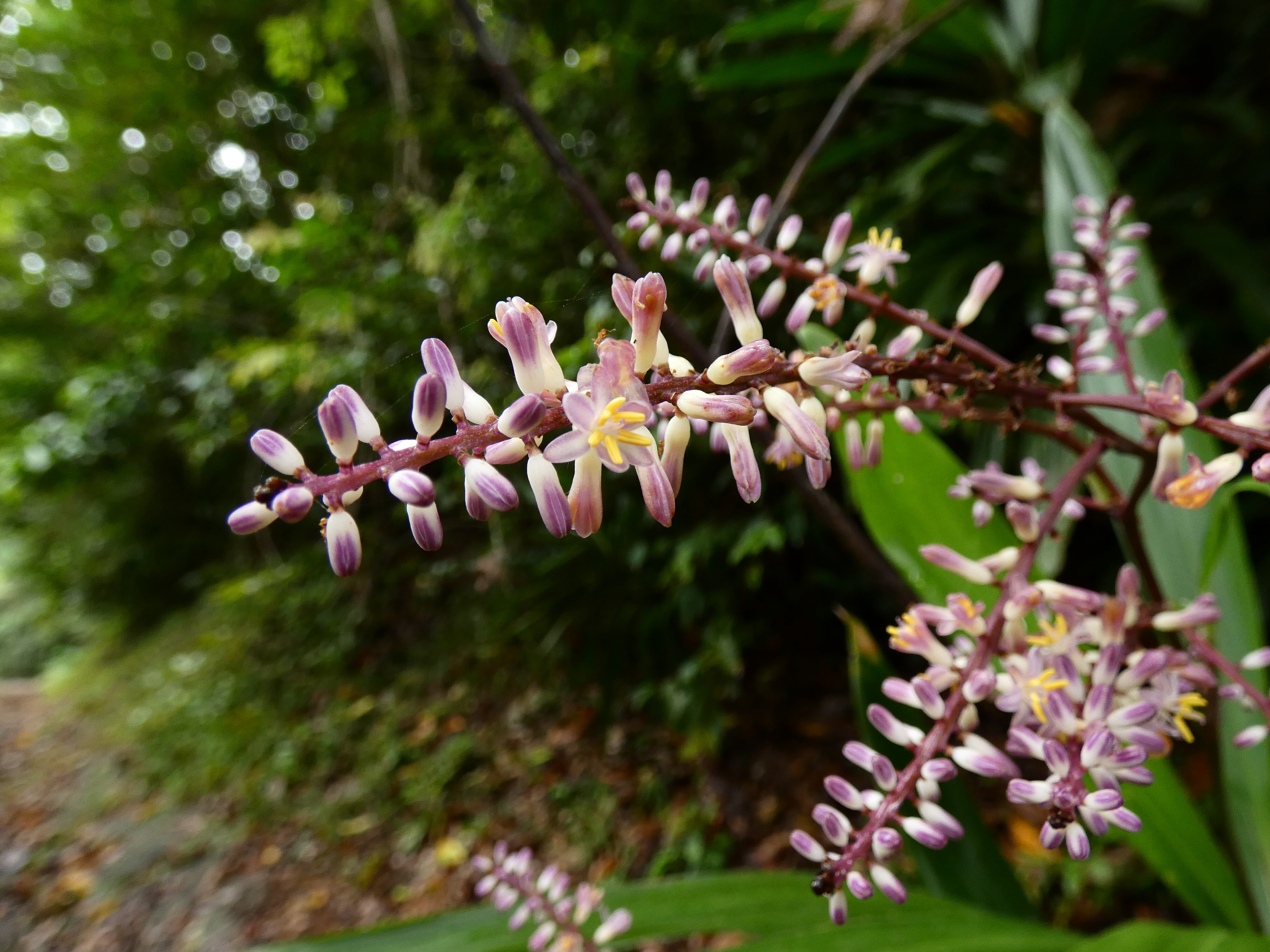
Flowers and buds

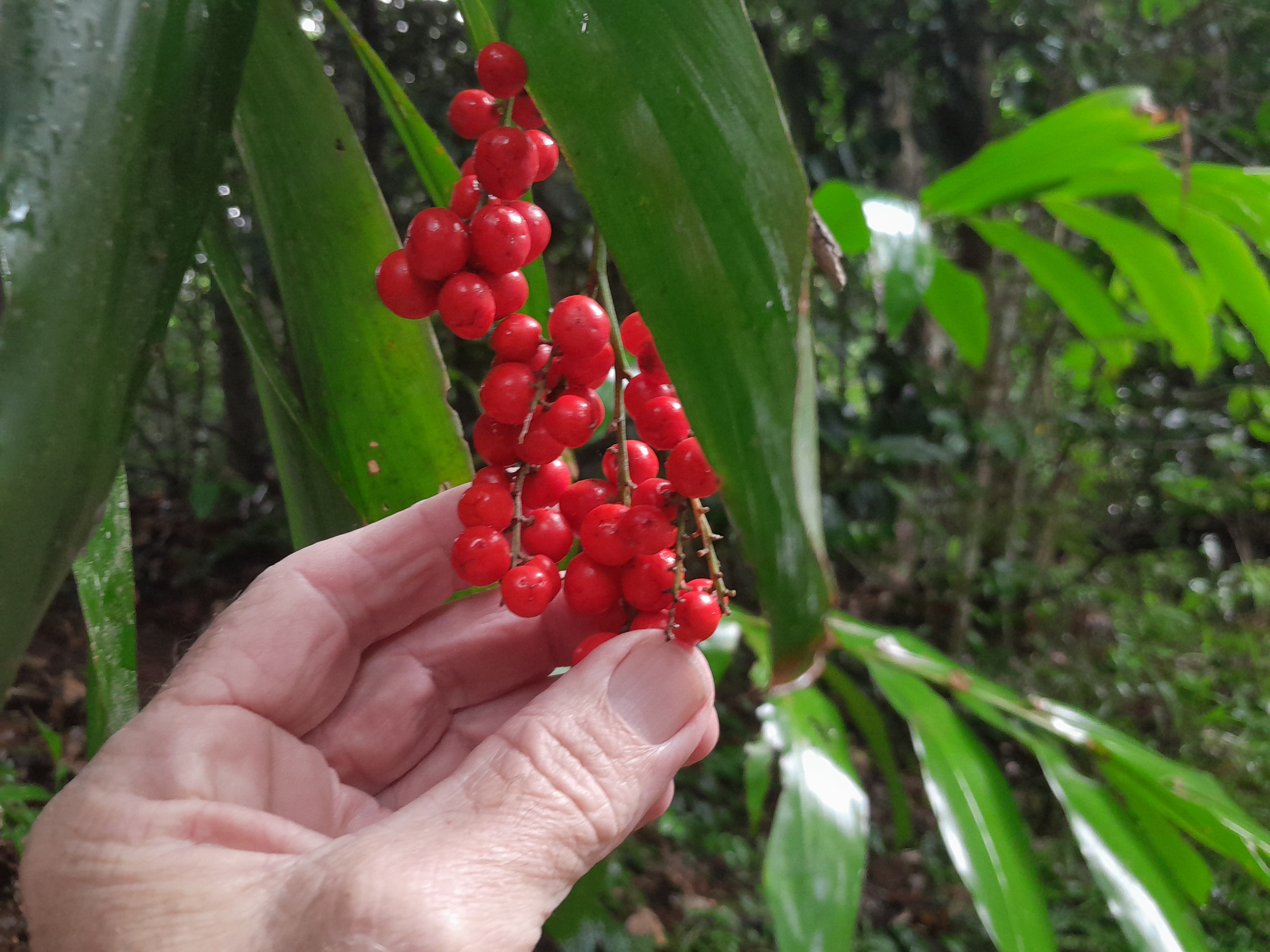
Fruit
