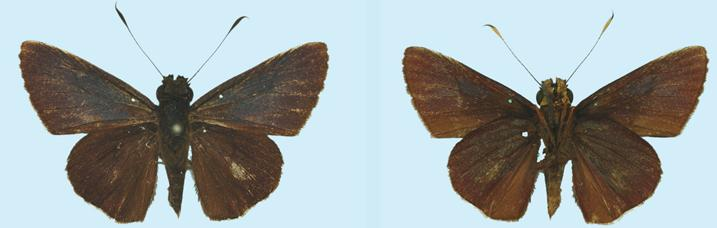
- Upperside (left), underside (right)

Scientific classification
- Kingdom: Animalia
- Phylum: Arthropoda
- Class: Insecta
- Order: Lepidoptera
- Family: Hesperiidae
- Genus: Sabera
- Species: S. metallica

Binomial name
- Sabera metallica de Jong, 2008

= Sabera metallica =

Species of butterfly

Sabera metallica is a butterfly of the family Hesperiidae. It is found in Papua on New Guinea.

The length of the forewings is about 15.5 mm.
