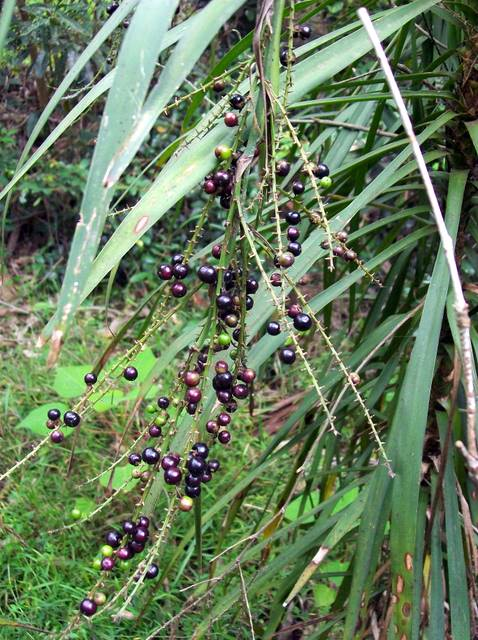
- Cordyline stricta at West Pennant Hills, Australia

Scientific classification
- Kingdom: Plantae
- Clade: Tracheophytes
- Clade: Angiosperms
- Clade: Monocots
- Order: Asparagales
- Family: Asparagaceae
- Subfamily: Lomandroideae
- Genus: Cordyline
- Species: C. stricta

Binomial name
- Cordyline stricta (Sims) Endl.
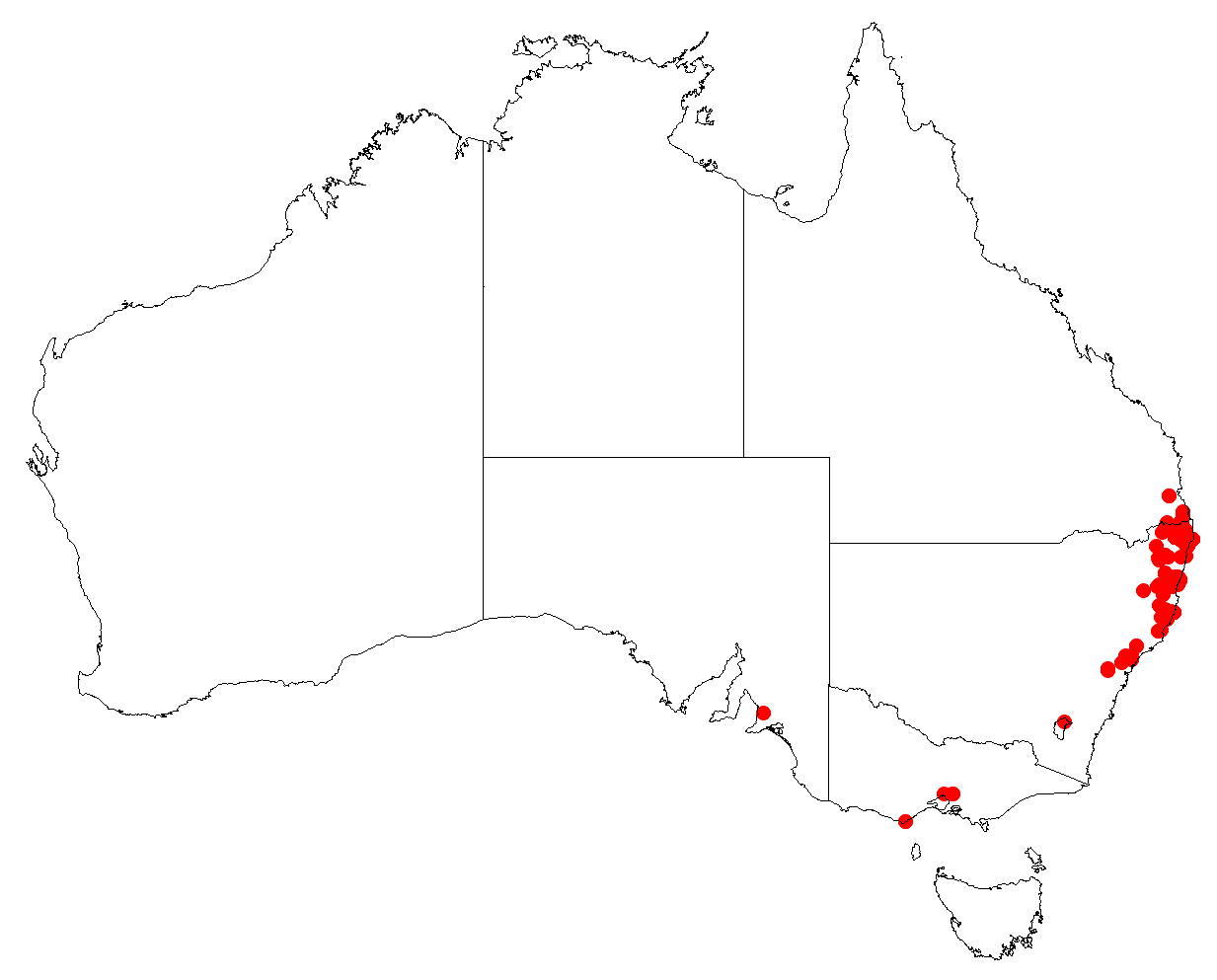
- Occurrence data from AVH

Synonyms
- Dracaena stricta Sims (basionym); Charlwoodia stricta (Sims) Sweet; Terminalis stricta (Sims) Kuntze; Charlwoodia stricta (Sims)Sweet; Cordyline stricta var. discolor Wiegand; Cordyline stricta var. grandis Wiegand; Taetsia stricta (Sims) Standl.

= Cordyline stricta =

Slender Palm Lily

Species of flowering plant

Cordyline stricta, known as the slender palm lily or narrow-leaved palm lily, is an evergreen Australian plant. A shrub to 5 metres tall found in wet sclerophyll forest and rainforest, usually on the coastal lowlands. From near Bilpin, New South Wales further north to Queensland. C. stricta has become naturalised in Victoria.

== Description ==
Leaves are long and thin, 30 to 50 cm long, 1 to 2 cm wide. Mauve flowers form on panicles, 20 to 40 cm long. The flowering stem is 15 to 30 cm long. Fruit are purple to black, 10 to 15 mm in diameter. This is the only Australian species of Cordyline with black fruit.

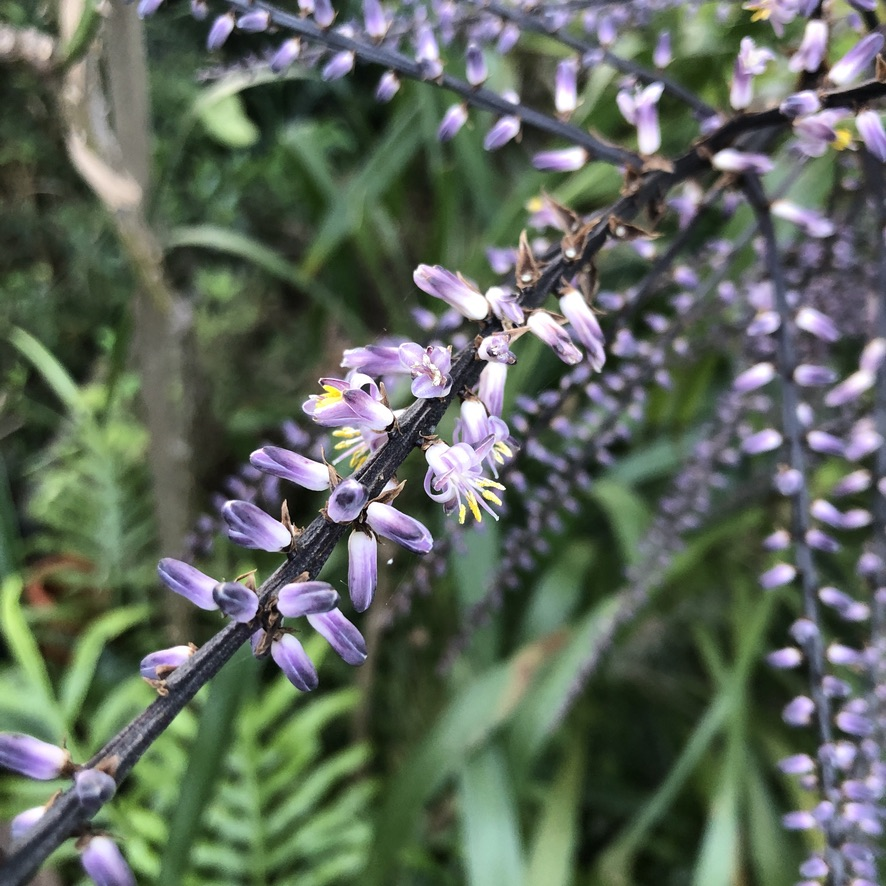
Narrow-leaved palm lily (Cordyline stricta)

== Uses ==
=== Cultivation ===
Cordyline stricta is widely planted in gardens and commercial landscapes for the ornamental value of both its foliage and flower heads and berries. Its tall, narrow growth makes it useful as a screen plant. C. stricta is adaptable to a wide range of climate and planting situations, from full sun to shade, and is moderately drought tolerant once established. It does not tolerate frost well.

=== Ecological ===
Cordyline stricta is a host plant for Yellow-streaked Swift caterpillars.
